= Yilan Green Expo =

Annual events in Su'ao, Yilan County, Taiwan

Yilan Green Expo 宜蘭綠色博覽會
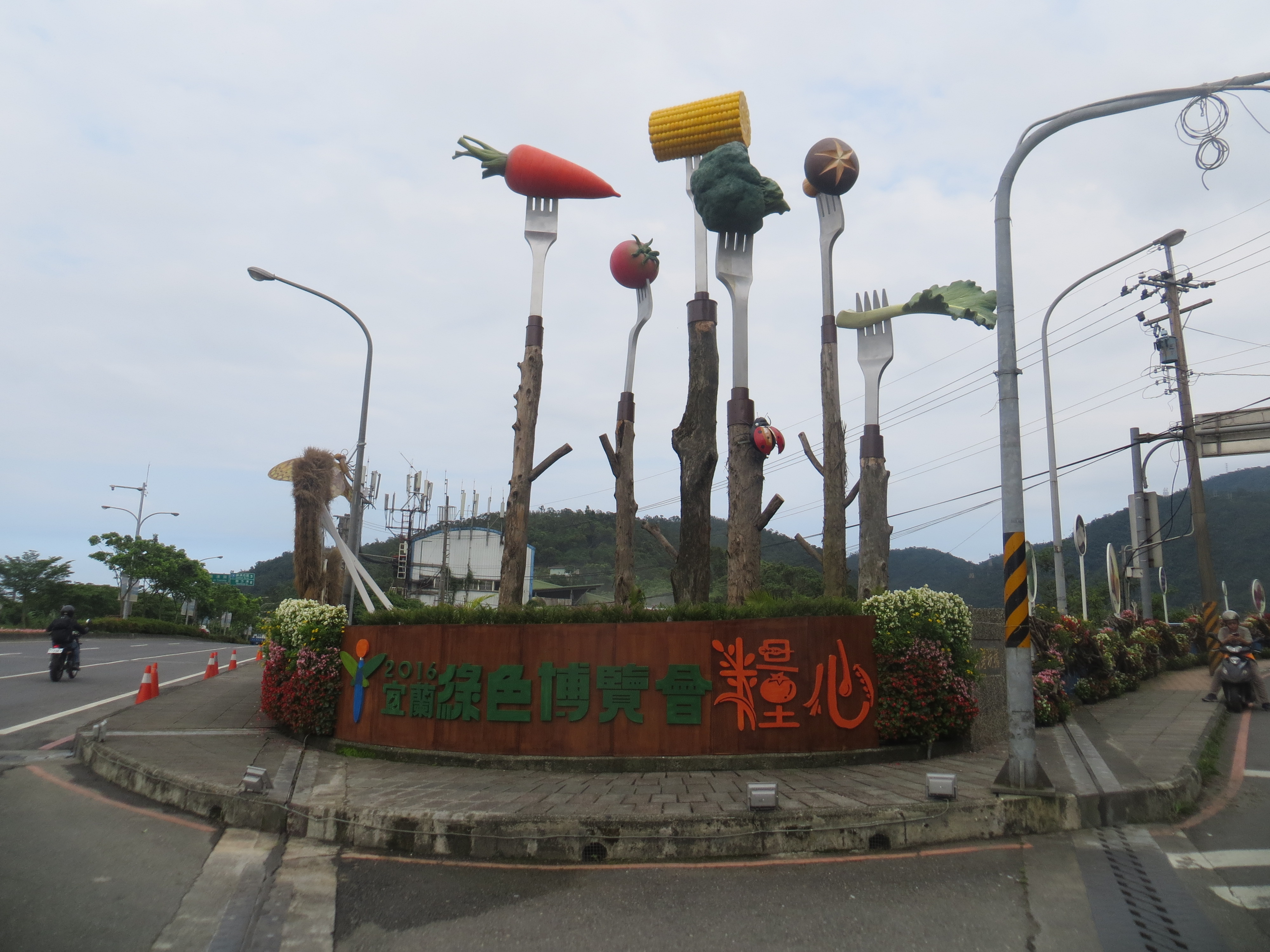
- Frequency: Annually
- Locations: Su'ao, Yilan County, Taiwan
- Inaugurated: 2000

The Yilan Green Expo (simplified Chinese: 宜兰绿色博览会; traditional Chinese: 宜蘭綠色博覽會; pinyin: Yílán Lǜsè Bólǎnhuì) is an annual exhibition on the environment held during spring in Yilan County, Taiwan.

== History ==
The exhibition was first held in 2000.

== Finance ==
From 2000 to 2019, the exhibition received subsidies from the Council of Agriculture totaling NT$500 million, and generated NT$10 billion in business.

== Exhibitions ==
=== 2016 ===
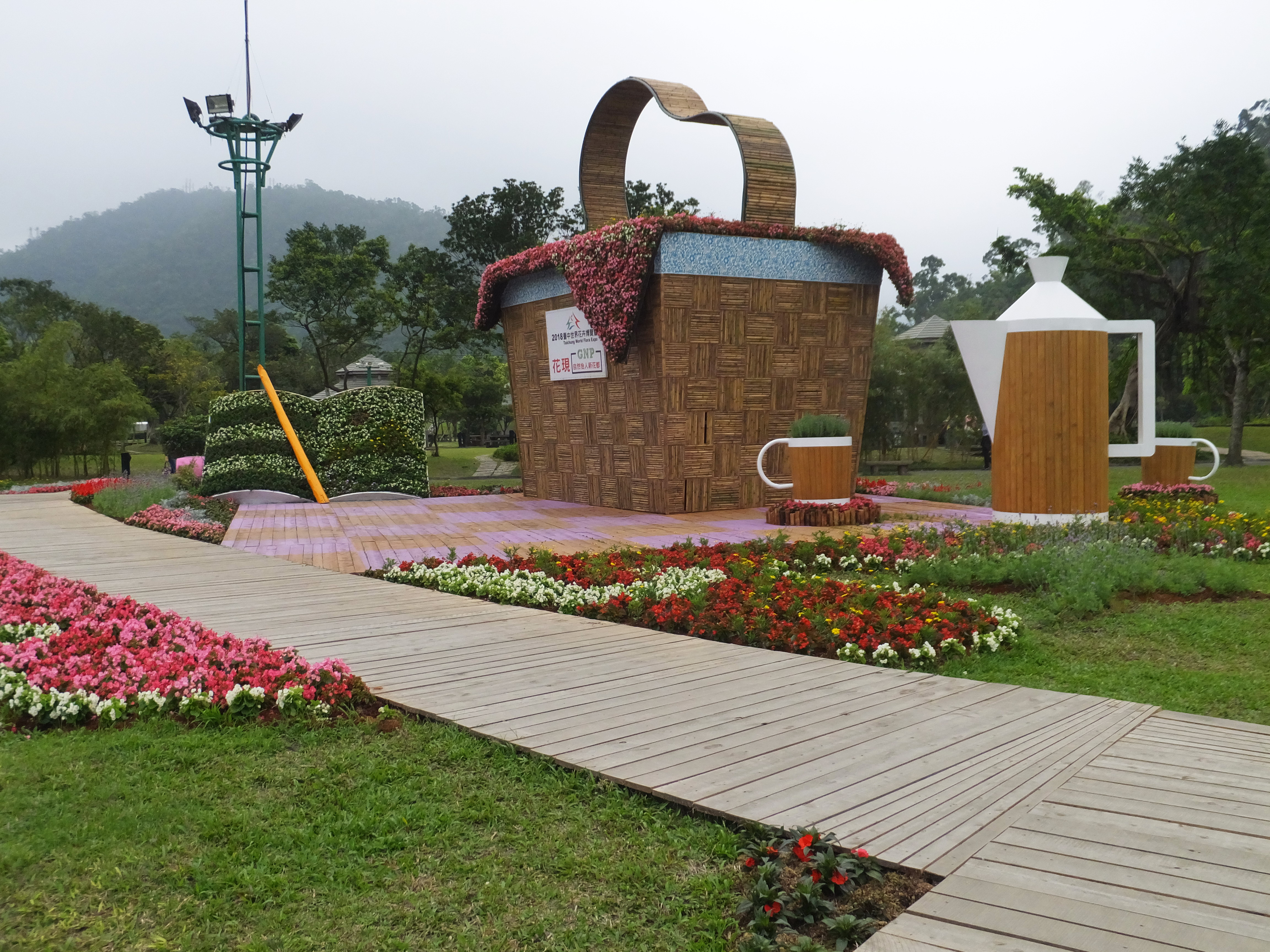
2016 Yilan Green Expo

The 17th Yilan Green Expo was held in Wulaoken River Valley (Chinese: 武荖坑風景區) from 26 March to 15 May 2016. Its focus was on food safety; food security; and advocacy of a green, healthy, and sustainable lifestyle. It had five exhibition theme zones and 38 exhibitors.

=== 2018 ===
The 19th Yilan Green Expo was held from 31 March to 13 May 2018.

=== 2019 ===
The 20th Yilan Green Expo was held around Dongshan Railway Station and Dongshan River Ecoark from 30 March to 12 May 2019. It had a theme of "Green Traveling". It promoted ecological conservation, environmental education, environmental-friendly farming, and circular economy.
