= Yilan County, Taiwan =

County in Taiwan

Yilan County 宜蘭縣 (Note: In local languages: Traditional Chinese script: 宜蘭縣; Mandarin Pinyin: Yílán Xiàn; Hokkien: Gî-lân Kuān; Sixian Hakka: Ngǐ-lǎn Ien; Hailu Hakka: Ngi-lan Rhǎn) Giran, I-lan, Ilan
- County
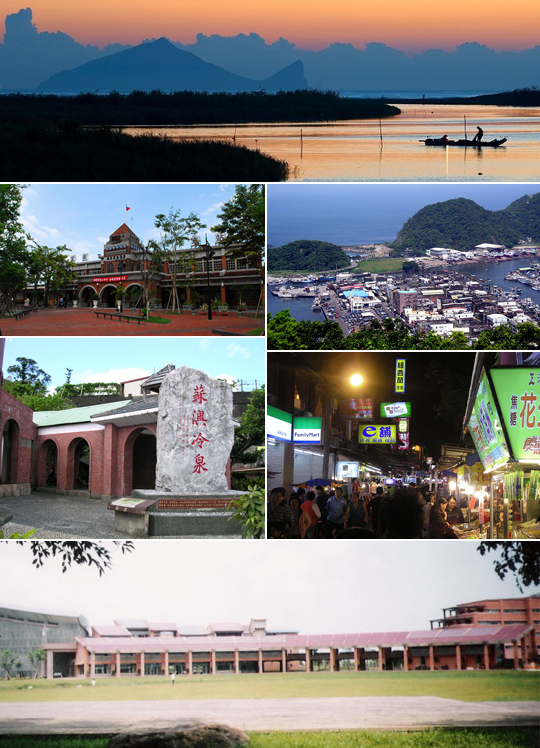
- Top row: Confluence of the Dongshan River and Lanyang River with Guishan Island in view; second (from left to right): Yilan railway station, Su'ao Port; third: Su'ao Cold Spring, Luodong Night Market, bottom: Institute of Yilan County History

- Flag Logo

- Coordinates: 24°45′2″N 121°45′33″E
- Country: Republic of China (Taiwan)
- Province: Taiwan^{a}
- Part of Taihoku Prefecture: 17 April 1895
- Wirhin Taipei County: 7 January 1946
- Separation from Taipei County: 10 October 1950
- Seat: Yilan City
- Subdivisions: 11 townships, 1 county-administered city

Government
  - Body: Yilan County Government; Yilan County Council
  - Magistrate: Lin Mao-sheng (acting)

Area
  - Total: 2,143.6251 km^{2} (827.6583 sq mi)
  - Rank: 6 of 22

Population (September 2023)
  - Total: 450,031
  - Rank: 17 of 22
  - Density: 209.939/km^{2} (543.740/sq mi)
- Time zone: UTC+8 (National Standard Time)
- ISO 3166 code: TW-ILA
- Website: enwww.e-land.gov.tw
- Symbols
- Flower: Cymbidium
- Tree: Chinese flame tree (Koelreuteria formosana)
- ^{a} In Taiwan, provinces remain a nominal division according to the Taiwanese constitution, but are no longer considered to have any administrative function practically.

Yilan County
- Traditional Chinese: 宜蘭縣
Transcriptions
Standard Mandarin
- Hanyu Pinyin: yí lán xiàn
- Bopomofo: ㄧˊ ㄌㄢˊ ㄒㄧㄢˋ
- Gwoyeu Romatzyh: Yilan Shiann
- Wade–Giles: I^{2}-lan^{2} Hsien^{4}
- Tongyong Pinyin: Yílán Siàn
- MPS2: Yílán Shiàn
- IPA: [ǐ.lǎn ɕjɛ̂n]
Hakka
- Pha̍k-fa-sṳ: Ngì-làn-yen
Southern Min
- Hokkien POJ: Gî-lân-koān
- Tâi-lô: Gî-lân-kuān

Yilan, alternately spelled I-lan, is a county in northeastern Taiwan. It has a population of 450,031, and its seat is located in Yilan City.

Before the Han Chinese settler Wu Sha led his company into large-scale reclamation in today's Yilan in 1787, the area was mainly inhabited by the indigenous Kavalan people. During the Japanese rule, much of the present day Yilan County was part of Japan within its Taihoku Prefecture. When the Republic of China took over Taiwan in 1945, it became part of Taipei County until 10 October 1950 when 12 southeastern townships of Taipei County split off to form the present day Yilan County.

== Name ==
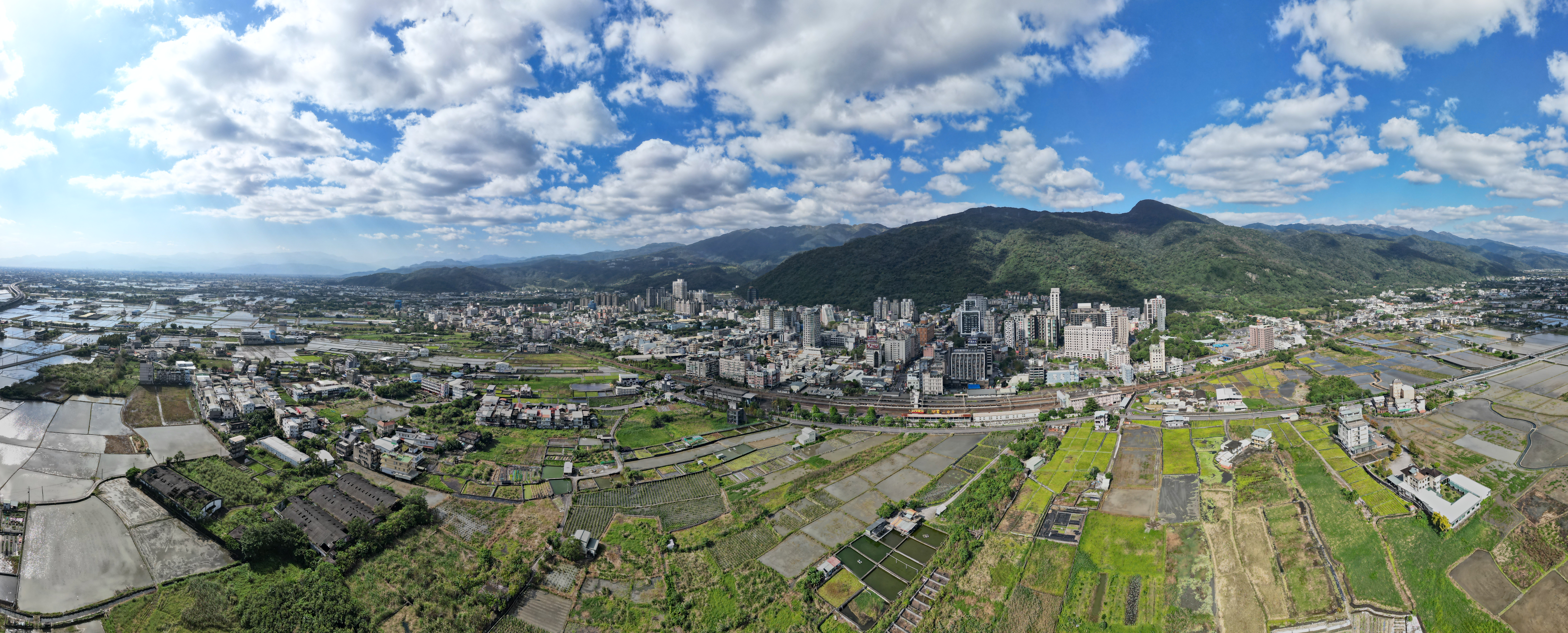
Jiaoxi Aerial Panorama with Jiaoxi Train Station, Yilan in the middle of the frame. December 2022.

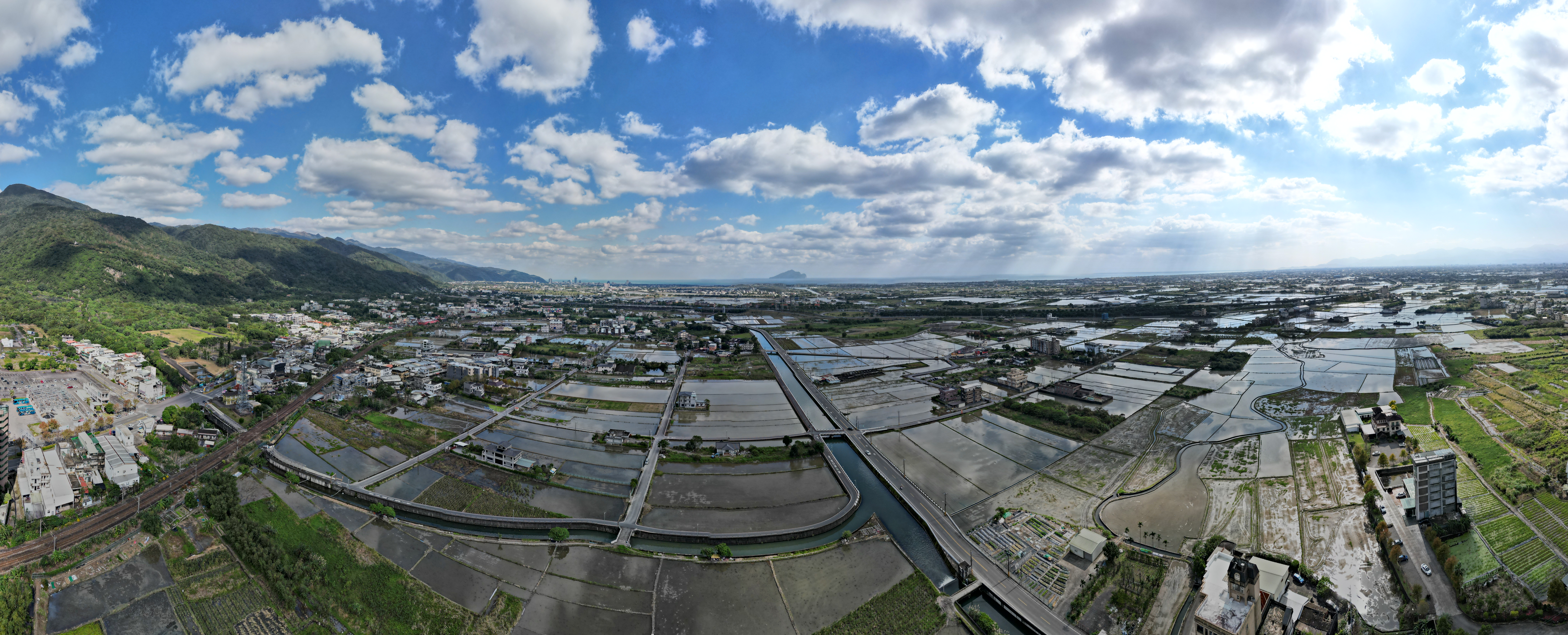
Jiaoxi Township in Yilan from above with Turtle Island 龜山島, Taiwan's one active Volcano, sitting on the horizon in the middle of the frame.

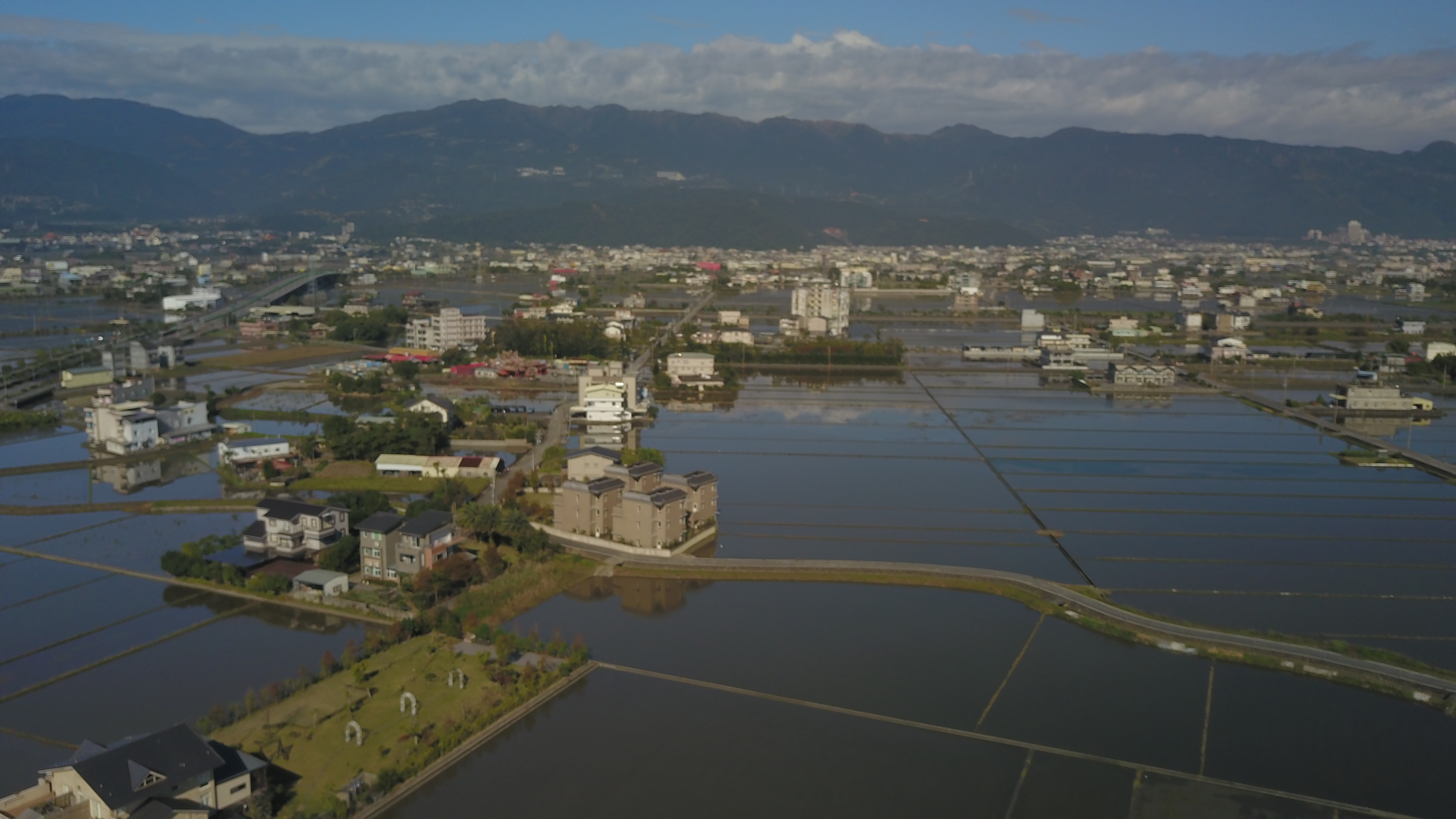
Yilan County in Taiwan

The name Yilan derives from the indigenous Kavalan people. Other former names in reference to this area in the Yilan Plain include Kabalan, Kavalan, Kavaland, kap-a-lan, Yiland and Gilan. Before 2009, the county's official name was transliterated as Ilan.

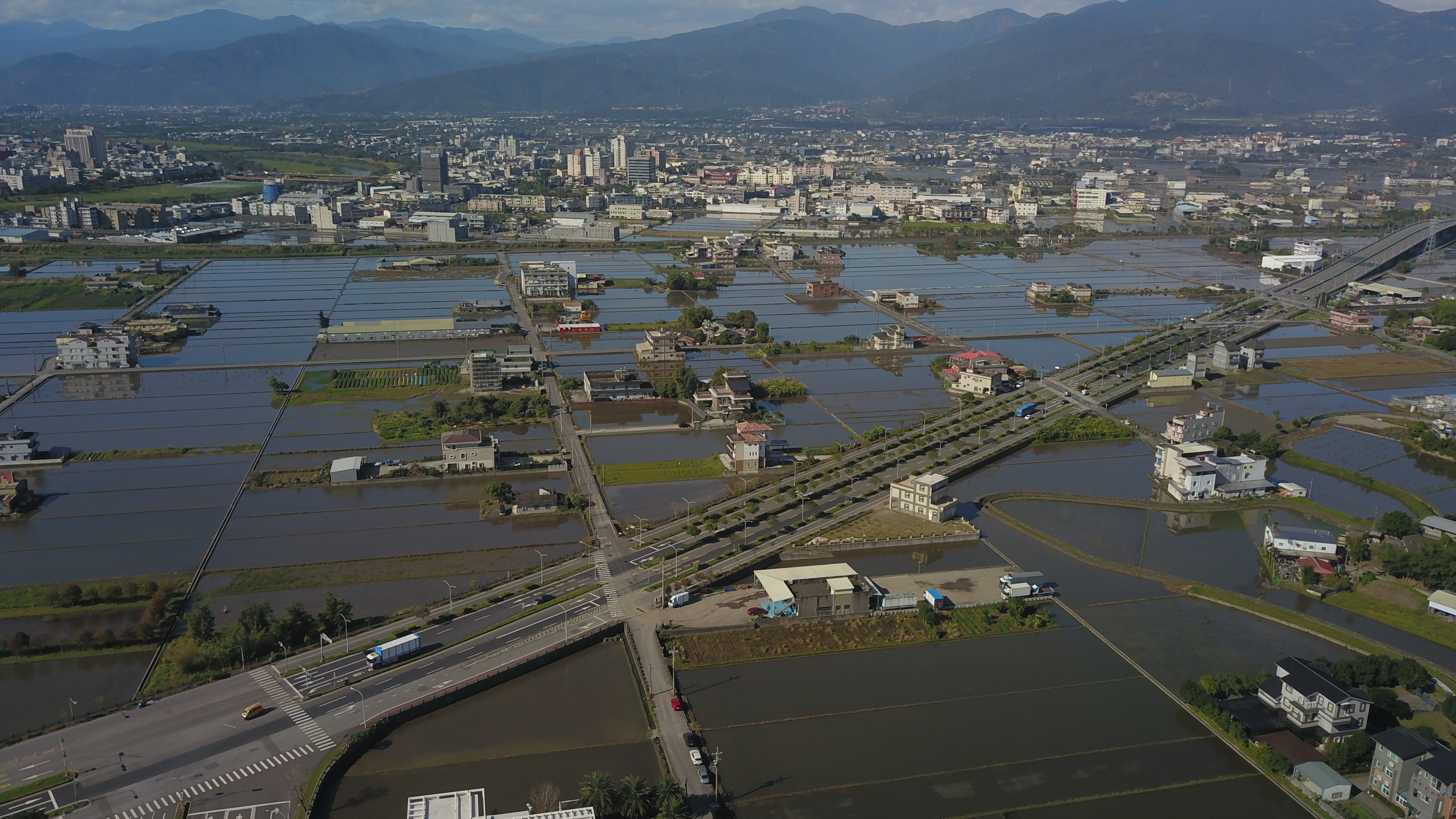
Yilan County in Taiwan from above

== History ==
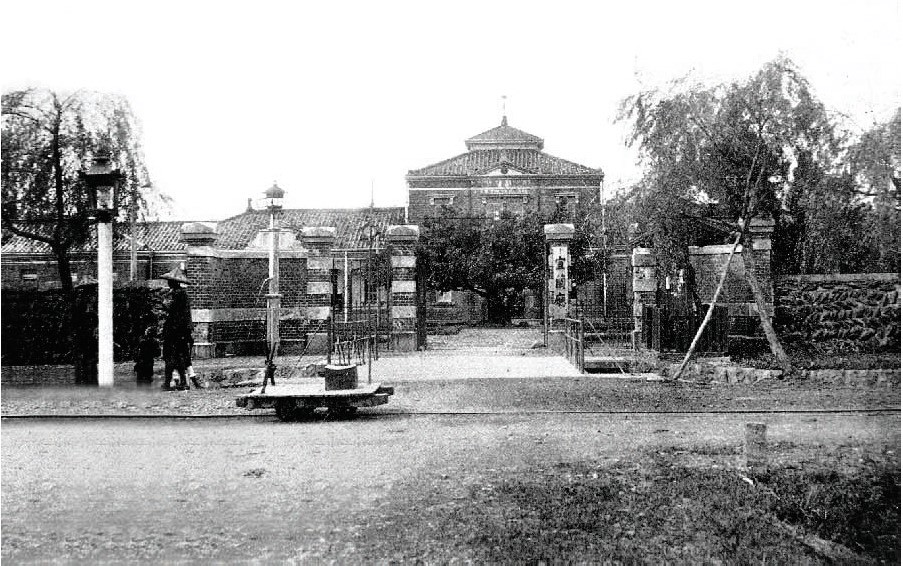
Yilan Government building in 1915

=== Early history ===
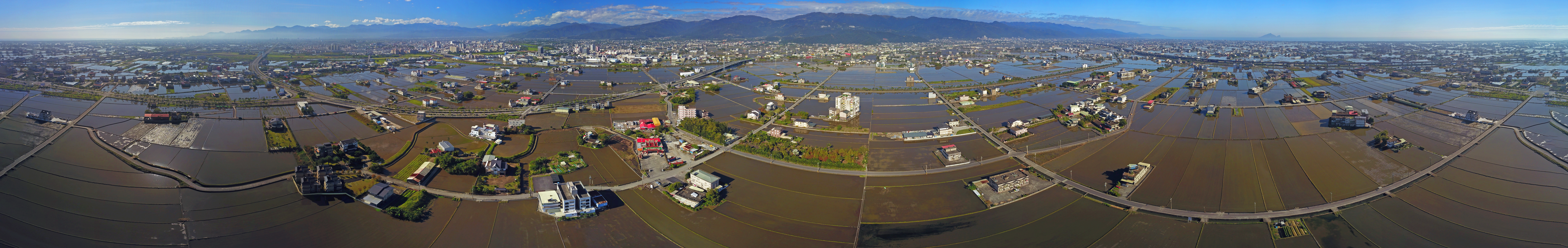
Yilan Plain farms and rice paddy Panorama in Taiwan

Since early ages, many people have traveled from far places to Yilan. Indigenous tribes that have settled in Yilan are Kavalan people and Atayal people.

The Kavalan people came by the sea and lived by the river at Yilan Plain since around 1,000 years ago. They mostly speak the Austronesian languages. Their settlements consisted of small villages along rivers with around 40–50 communities scattered around the area with a total population of approximately 10,000 people. The Atayal people came by crossing the Xiyuan Pass and settled in the mountain areas.

The Atayal people arrived in Yilan around 250 years ago and settled along the upper Dazhuoshui River. Later, the tribes crossed the Siyuan Pass to reach the valley upstream of the Zhuoshui River. These people are the current residents of Datong Township. Other parts of the Atayal people headed east to enter and settle along the Nan'ao North River and Heping North River. These groups are now settled in Nan-ao Township.

Around 200 years ago, at the end of the 18th century, the Han Chinese traversed the mountain range and settled in Yilan. Large populations began taming the wilderness, cultivating the fields and building irrigation channels. They used various means to seize lands from the Kavalans. Some Kavalans left their homes while some others migrated southwards to Hualien and Taitung coastlines and established settlements.

=== Spanish Formosa ===
The Spaniards began arriving in Taiwan in the 17th century. In 1626, the Spaniards led an invasion under the pretext of ship crews having been slain by Taiwanese barbarians. They then torched harbors and surrounding villages, and even went as far as taking over Su'ao Town and established a city called Saint Lorenzo.

=== Dutch Formosa ===
The Spaniards were subsequently ousted by the Dutch who had taken over the southern part of Taiwan and established Dutch Formosa. In 1640, the Dutch began contacting Han Chinese merchants for trade and levying taxes on various commercial goods. The merchants had to pay all company taxes but also enjoyed the right to monopolize trade.

=== Kingdom of Tungning ===
During the Kingdom of Tungning era, the previous economy monopoly system developed during the Dutch Formosa continued to be practiced.

=== Qing dynasty ===
When the Qing dynasty annexed Taiwan, they established the Kavalan sub-prefecture in Yilan. In 1806, armed conflicts broke out among various ethnic immigrants, followed by pillaging by pirates. The Qing dynasty government subsequently realized that if they continued to disregard the Kavalan people and did not establish rule of law and a system of defense, Yilan would become a haven for criminals and outlaws, a thorn in the side for Taiwan. In 1809, Jiaqing Emperor incorporated Kavalan into the domain of the empire. Troops were dispatched to quell pirate attacks and chart local territory.

Local government systems in Taiwan underwent many changes during the Qing dynasty period. But with regards to administrative levels lower than the county, including local villages, there were no major changes. The earliest organization and planning of Yilan consisted of seven citadels. In 1835, the seven citadels were further divided into 12 citadels based on the needs of the changing population and environment. This arrangement remained unchanged until the end of Qing dynasty rule.

After the Mudan Incident in 1874, Qing rulers changed their passive attitude and took a more ambitious approach in ruling Taiwan. The original aboriginal term Kavalan district was renamed with a more Han-centric Yilan name and the administrative system was also changed accordingly from the original temporary "district" to a formally governed "county". In 1875, the newly created Taipeh Prefecture included modern-day Yilan County.

=== Empire of Japan ===
After the First Sino-Japanese War in 1894, the Qing government handed over Taiwan to Japan in accordance with the Treaty of Shimonoseki. Modern-day Yilan County covers Giran District (宜蘭郡), Ratō District (羅東郡), Suō District (蘇澳郡) and Giran City (宜蘭市) as they existed from 1920 to 1945, all under Taihoku Prefecture, during Japanese rule.

=== Republic of China ===
After the handover of Taiwan from Japan to the Republic of China in October 1945, the present-day area of Yilan County was incorporated under Taipei County. On 10 October 1950, Yilan County was established as a county of Taiwan Province with Yilan City as the county seat. In 1998, the government streamlined Taiwan Province and Yilan County became administered by the Executive Yuan while the remaining institutions of this province have been dissolved in 2018.

== Geography ==
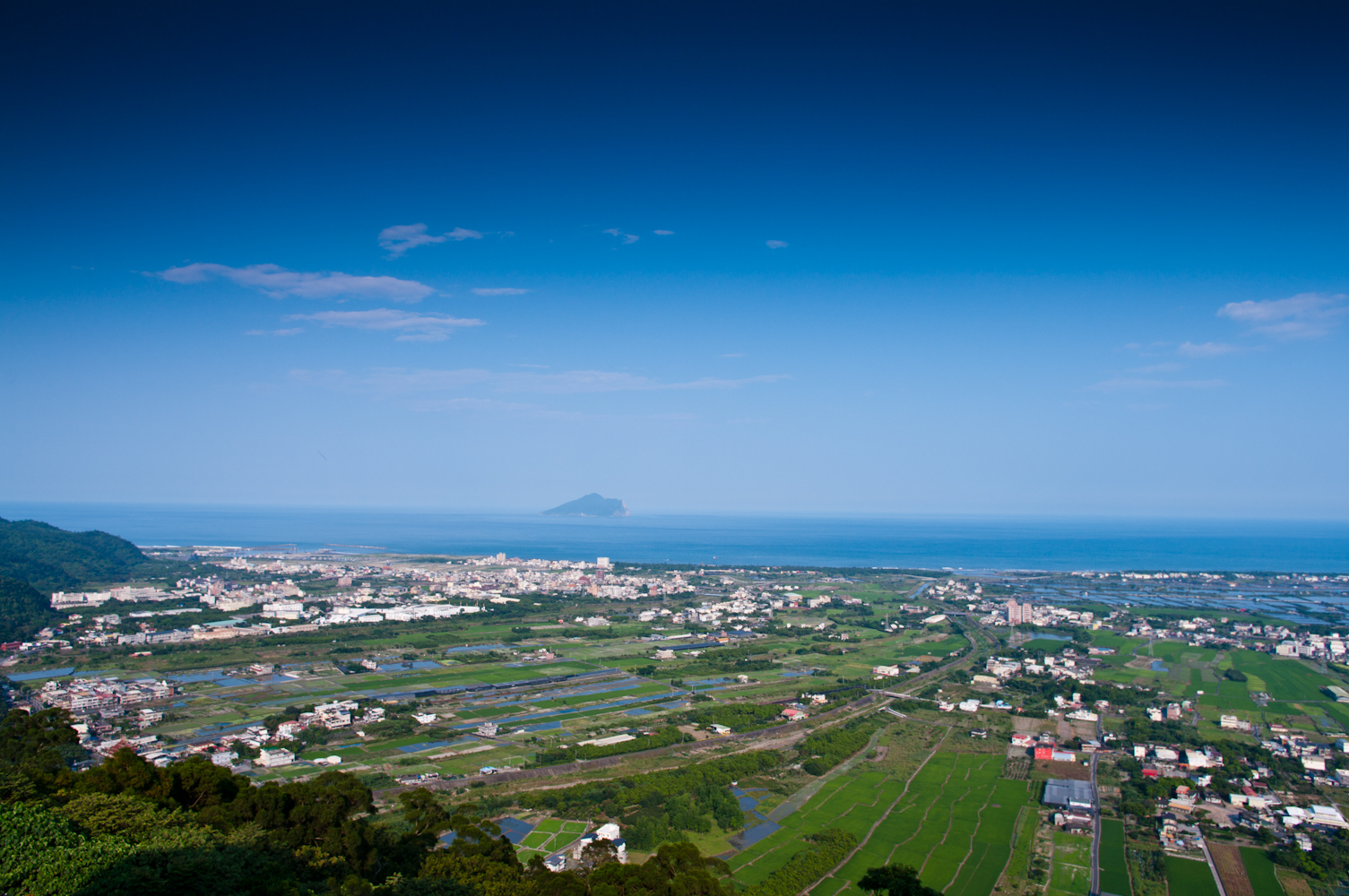
Yilan Plain

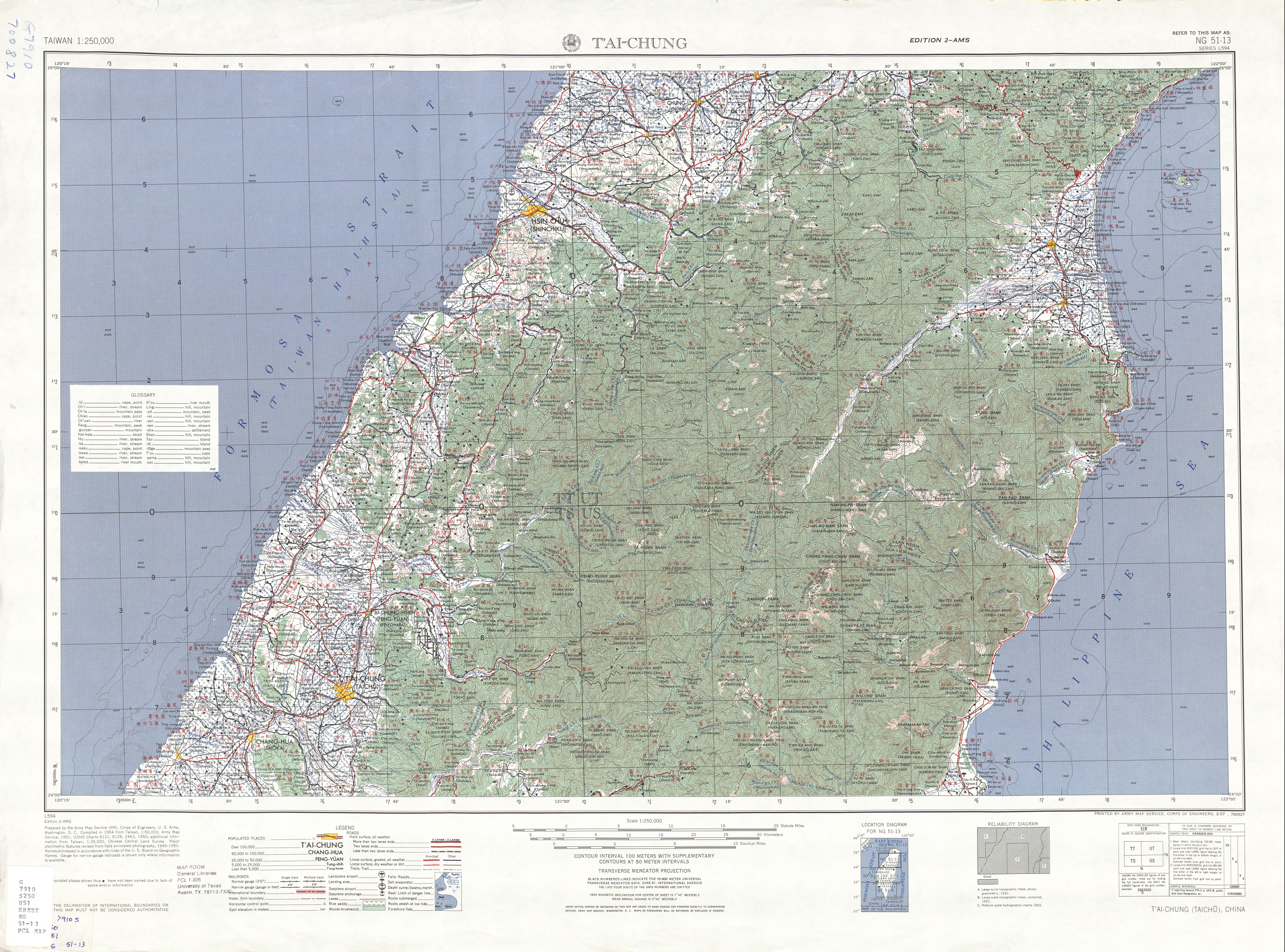
Map including Yilan (labeled as I-lan (Giran) 宜蘭) (1954)

Yilan County sits on the Yilan Plain, a combined alluvial plain created by Lanyang River and other minor streams with a rough shape of triangle. On the three vertices of the triangle sit the Toucheng, Sanxing and Su-ao Townships with a roughly equal distance of 30 km on the three sides. The Xueshan Range sits on the northwest of Yilan County from Toucheng to Sanxing. The county is geographically divided into the cliffs and the plains. The Central Mountain Range sits to the south from Sanxing to Su'ao.

The Upper Lanyang River is steep and the rapid current is highly erosive. Large amount of silt carried by the river have little time to settle because of the high slope of the lands where it flows out of the mountains and valleys. An alluvial fan is formed as a result of scattered sand and gravel settling down. Large amount of gravel accumulate in the shallow stream bed, creating alluvial fans that often forms into web-like pattern. The river tends to change courses after floods caused by heavy rainfall or river overflow. The Lanyang River slows down as it reaches mid and downstream where silt begins to settle.

Yilan County is located in the northeastern Taiwan Island which covers an area of 2,143 km^{2}. The longest distance from east to west is 63 km and from north to south is 74 km. From the mountain areas downwards, the land falls in altitude in the stages of mountains, alleys, alluvial plains, lowlands, swamps, sand hills and finally coastline.

Yilan's Toucheng Township includes Guishan Island and Guiluan Island. The Senkaku Islands, known in Mandarin as the Tiaoyutai Islands, are claimed as part of the township.

== Government ==
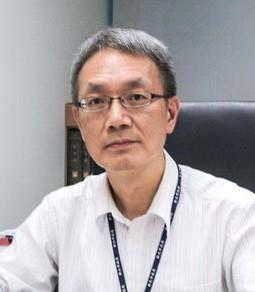
Lin Mao-sheng, the incumbent acting Magistrate of Yilan County

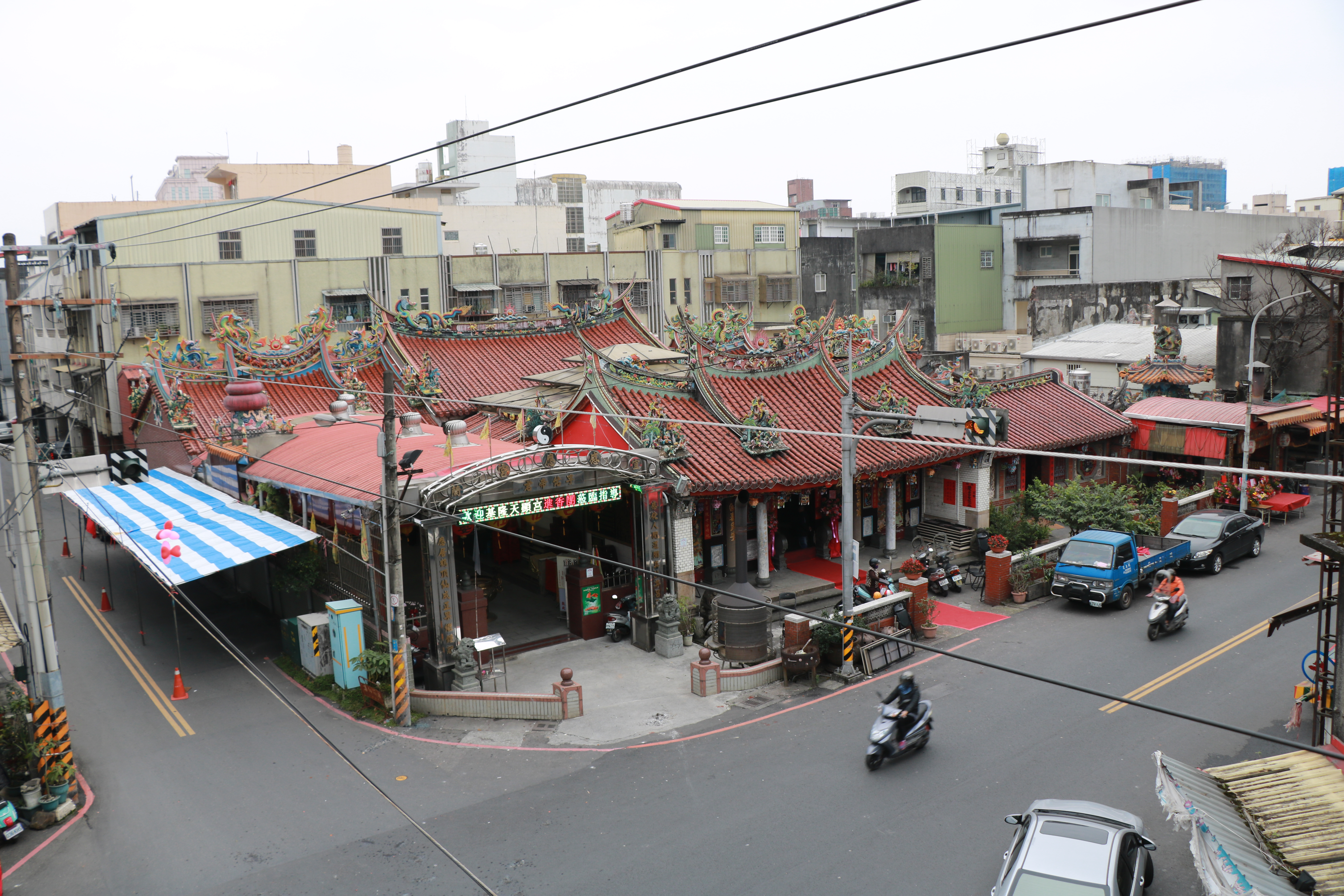
Yilan City, the county seat of Yilan County

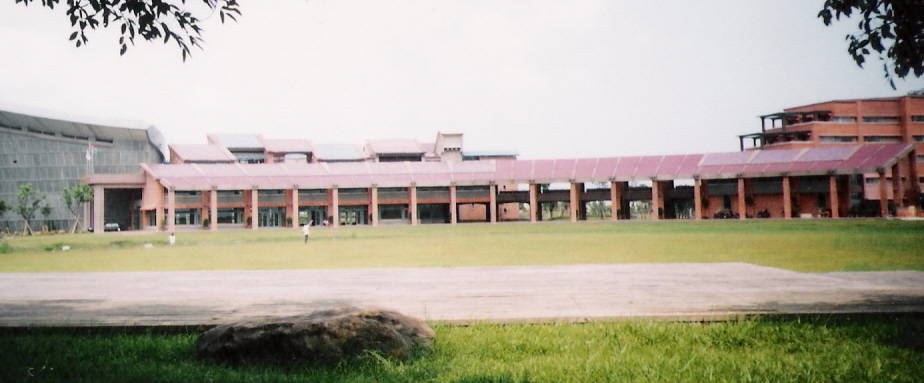
Yilan County Government

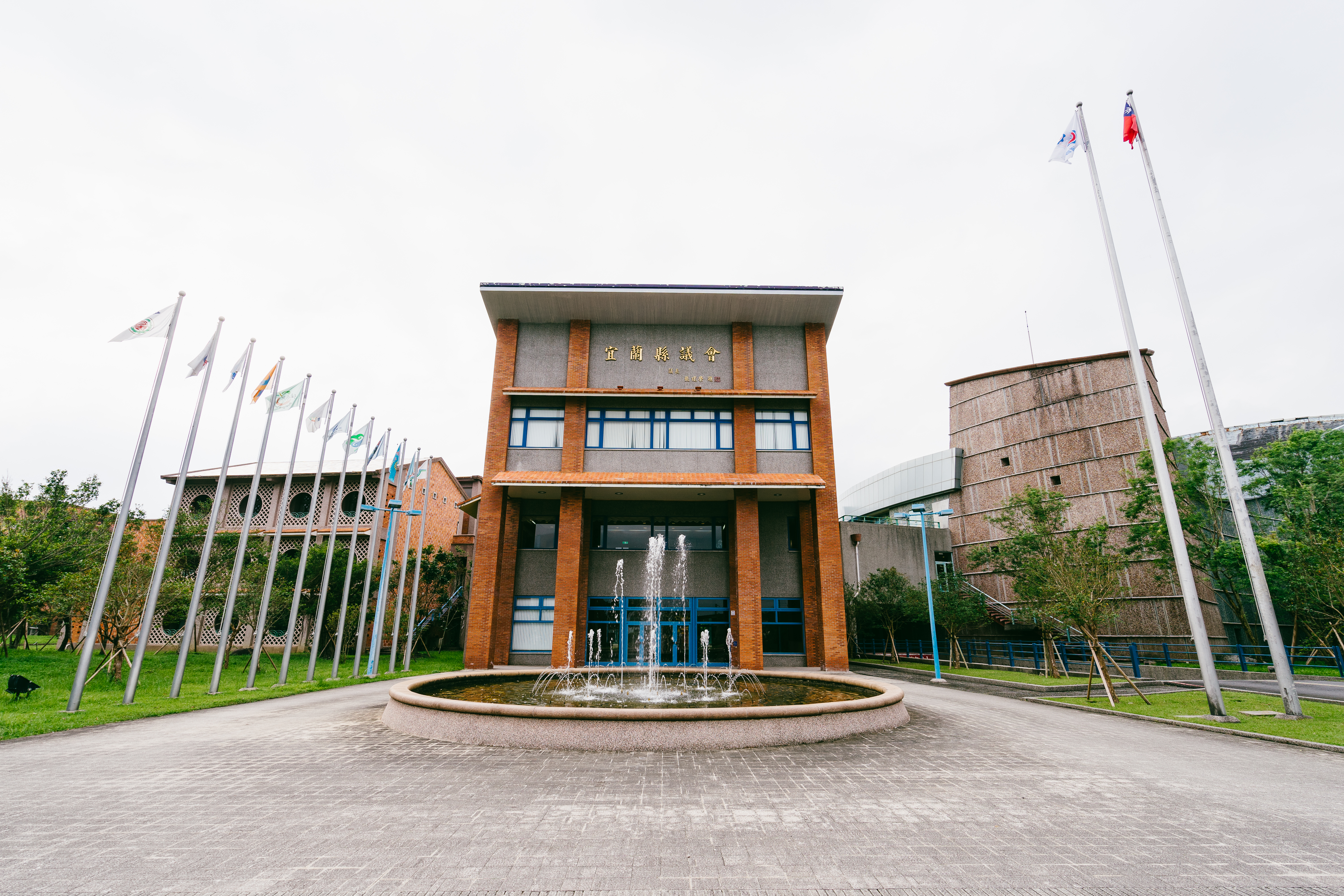
Yilan County Council

Yilan County is administered as a county of Taiwan Province. Yilan City is the county seat which houses the Yilan County Government and Yilan County Council. The county is headed by acting Magistrate Lin Mao-sheng.

=== Elected magistrates ===
- Chen Ding-nan (1981–1989)
- Yu Shyi-kun (1989–1997)
- Liu Shou-cheng (1997–2005)
- Lu Kuo-hua (2005–2009)
- Lin Tsung-hsien (2009–2017)
  - Wu Tze-cheng (2017) (acting)
  - Chen Chin-te (2017–2018) (acting)
- Lin Zi-miao (2018–2024)
  - Lin Mao-sheng (2024–) (acting)

=== Administrative divisions ===
Yilan County is divided into 1 city, 3 urban townships, 6 rural townships and 2 mountain indigenous townships.

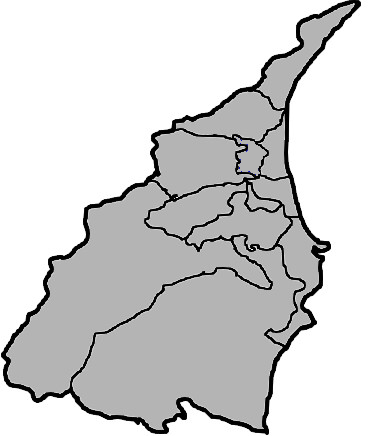
Yilan County administrative divisions map (on Taiwan Island)

Type	Name	Chinese	Taiwanese	Hakka	Formosan
City	Yilan City	宜蘭市	Gî-lân	Ngì-làn	Kebalan^{Kavalan}
Urban townships	Luodong	羅東鎮	Lô-tong	Lò-tûng	Rutung^{Kavalan}
Urban townships	Su'ao (Suao)	蘇澳鎮	So-ò/So·-ò	Sû-o	
Urban townships	Toucheng	頭城鎮	Thâu-siâⁿ	Thèu-sàng	
Rural townships	Dongshan	冬山鄉	Tang-soaⁿ	Tûng-sân	
Rural townships	Jiaoxi	礁溪鄉	Taⁿ-khe/Taⁿ-kheⁿ	Tsiâu-hâi	
Rural townships	Sanxing	三星鄉	Sam-sing	Sâm-sên	
Rural townships	Wujie	五結鄉	Gō·-kiat	Ńg-kiet	
Rural townships	Yuanshan	員山鄉	Îⁿ-soaⁿ	Yèn-sân	
Rural townships	Zhuangwei (Jhuangwei)	壯圍鄉	Chòng-ûi	Tsong-vì	
Mountain indigenous townships	Datong	大同鄉	Tāi-tông	Thai-thùng	Tayto Atayal
Mountain indigenous townships	Nan'ao	南澳鄉	Lâm-ò	Nàm-o	Nan'ao Atayal

Colors indicate the common language status of Formosan languages within each division.

=== Politics ===
Taiwanese presidential results in Yilan County
Year	DPP		KMT		Others	
Year	No.	%	No.	%	No.	%
2024	119,517	44.74%	77,441	28.99%	70,171	26.27%
2020	173,657	63.28%	90,010	32.80%	10,739	3.91%
2016	144,798	62.06%	59,216	25.38%	29,288	12.56%
2012	135,156	52.53%	115,496	44.89%	6,652	2.58%
2008	123,700	48.58%	130,951	51.42%		
2004	147,848	57.71%	108,361	42.29%		
2000	123,157	47.30%	51,082	19.51%	87,635	33.46%
1996	68,044	29.56%	126,405	54.92%	35,727	15.52%

Yilan County has been referred in Taiwanese political discourse, especially by the Pan-Green Coalition or the supporters of Democratic Progressive Party (DPP) as the "Sacred Place of Democracy" (民主聖地) , reflecting its prominent role in Taiwan's democratisation.

The DPP has won Yilan County in every presidential election since 1996 except for 2008. In the 2020 presidential election, Tsai-Ing Wen received a record vote total, securing the DPP's largest margin of victory in Yilan.

In 1981, Chen Ding-nan, an independent candidate backed by the Tangwai movement was elected as the non-Kuomintang (KMT) magistrate of Yilan. Chen Ding-nan joined DPP in 1993 and ran unsuccessful as the party's candidate for the Governor of Taiwan Province in 1994.

Since 2005, the control of county government has altered between KMT and DPP. The magistrate Lin Zi-miao from the KMT, elected in 2018, was suspended from office since December 31, 2024 following conviction on her corruption charge. Deputy Magistrate Lin Mao-sheng has served as the acting magistrate since her suspension.

Yilan County is represented by Chen Chun-yu of DPP at the Legislative Yuan, who was elected in 2024.

== Demographics and culture ==
Historical population
Year	Pop.	±%
1950	255,041	—
1955	298,455	+17.0%
1960	339,456	+13.7%
1965	378,881	+11.6%
1970	412,787	+8.9%
1975	427,655	+3.6%
1980	442,988	+3.6%
1985	449,981	+1.6%
1990	450,943	+0.2%
1995	465,043	+3.1%
2000	465,186	+0.0%
2005	460,426	−1.0%
2010	460,486	+0.0%
2015	458,117	−0.5%
2020	453,087	−1.1%
2025	449,336	−0.8%
Source: 1. "35年起宜蘭縣年度總人口數統計-宜蘭縣總人口數表" (ods) (in Chinese (Taiwan)). Civil Affairs Department of Yilan County Government. 2026-04-09.; 2. "Populations by city and country in Taiwan". Ministry of the Interior Population Census. Archived from the original on 2017-12-16.

View source data.

=== Population ===
Today Han Chinese comprises the majority of the population in Yilan County.

=== Language ===
- Taiwanese: Taiwanese in Yilan(Gî-lân) and some the northern (northeastern) coastal Taiwan is Zhangzhou dialect predominant
- Taiwanese Hakka
- Atayal language

== Education ==
National Ilan University

Education related affairs in Yilan County is governed by the Education Department of Yilan County Government. The county houses several public and private universities and colleges such as the National Ilan University, National Lan-Yang Girls' Senior High school, National Yilan Senior High School, Lan Yang Institute of Technology and St. Mary's Medicine Nursing and Management College.

== Energy ==
Yilan County has 40 MW renewable energy capacity from an incinerator plant and two hydroelectric power plants. It houses the Qingshui Geothermal Power Plant.

== Sports ==
Yilan County was the host for the 2009 Asian Rowing Championships.

== Tourist attractions ==
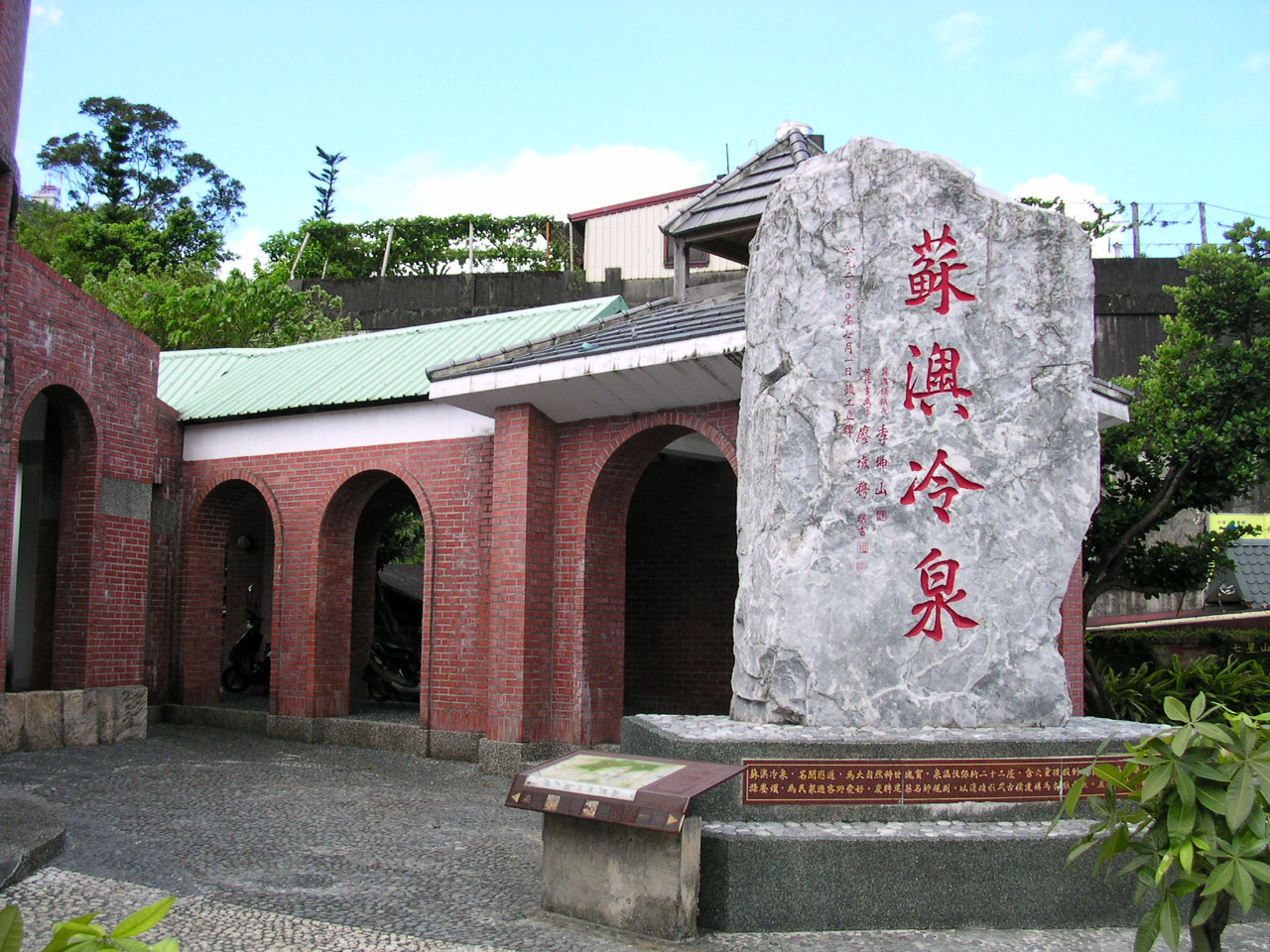
Su-ao Cold Spring.

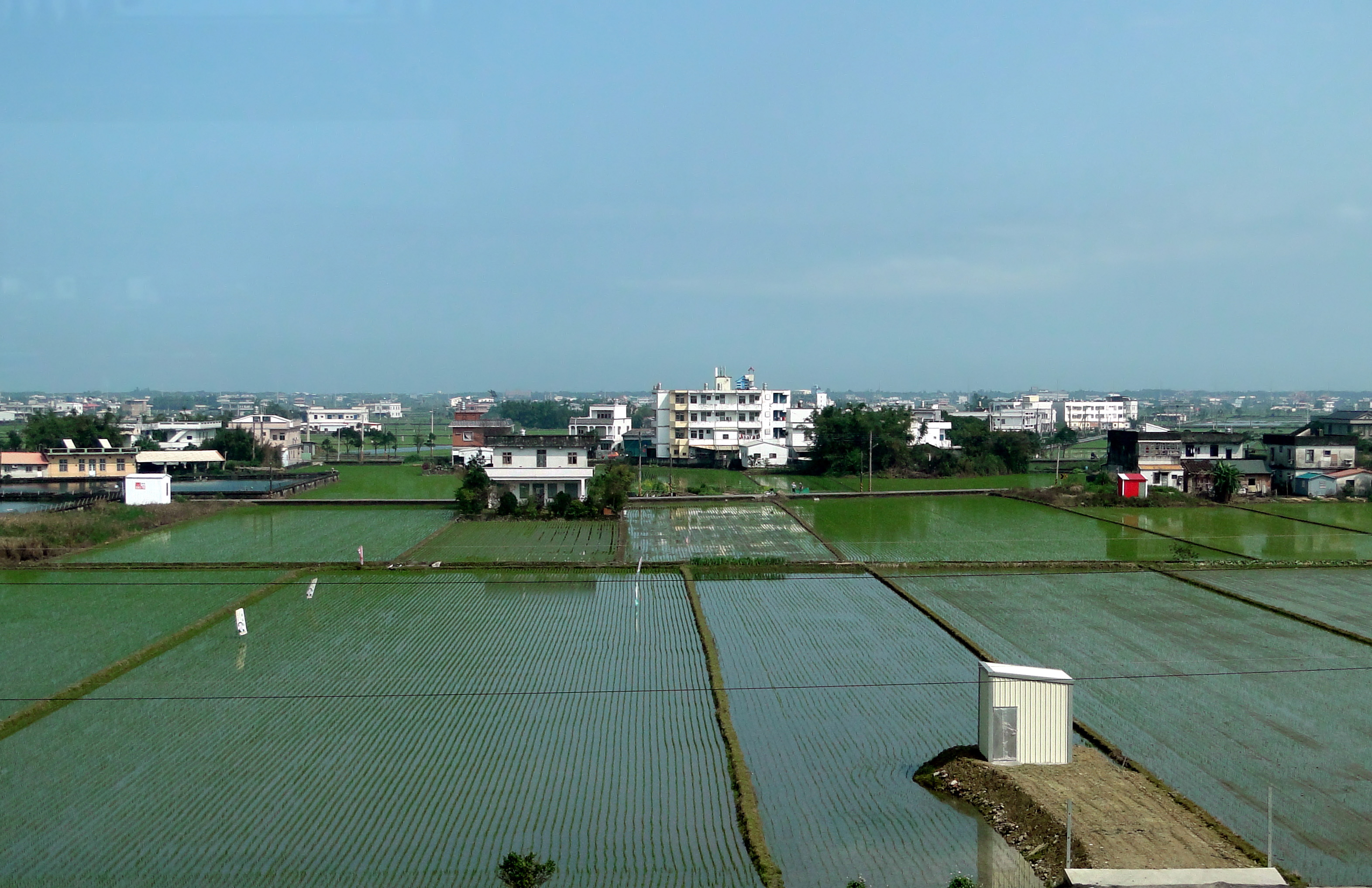
Paddy fields in Yilan County

- Atayal Life Museum
- Guishan Island
- Jim and Dad's Brewery
- Erjie Rice Barn
- Jiuliao River Ecological Park
- Luodong Forestry Culture Park
- Su'ao Fortress
- Memorial Hall of Founding of Yilan Administration
- Northeast and Yilan Coast National Scenic Area
- Jiaoxi Hot Springs (礁溪溫泉)
- Wufongci Scenic Area (五峰旗風景區)
- Kavalan Distillery
- Taiping Mountain
- Luodong Night Market
- National Center for Traditional Arts
- Spring Onion Culture Museum
- Changpi Lake
- Lee Rong-chun Literary Museum
- Old Dali Bridge
- Tofu Cape
- Yilan Brick Kiln
- Toucheng Leisure Farm
- Wufengqi Waterfall
- Wulaokeng Scenic Area
- Yilan Museum of Art
- Yilan Literary Museum
- Zhu Dayu Culture Museum
- Nantian Temple
- Kailu Xianfengye Temple
- Baitul Muslimin Mosque

=== Festivals ===
- Yilan International Children's Folklore and Folkgame Festival, “A dreamland for the children of Taiwan, a magnet for art from around the world, a garden of culture for the people of Ilan.” Seven years ago, these were the concepts that launched the first ICFFF, and over the years the people of Yilan have been making it happen step by step. Of all Taiwan’s folk festivals, the ICFFF is probably the best known internationally.
- Each summer, Dongshan River Water Park attracts countless children and the themes of the various years have become for many part of the collective memory. The number of people attending has grown each year since the festival was first held in 1996, surpassing one million visits for the first time in 2002. Not only does the event enrich Yilan's cultural soil and create business opportunities, it offers a highly successful example which other cities and counties across Taiwan can draw on as they also attempt to bring more culture and art into the life of their communities.
- Started from 2004, Yilan Green International Film Festival (GIFT; Chinese: 宜蘭國際綠色影展) is a non-competition film festival which launched its 3rd edition from 28/4 to 06/5, 2006. GIFT also aims to build up an archive collecting the selected works for the purposes of relevant research as well as education.
- Yilan International Collegiate Invitational Regatta
- Yilan Green Expo started from 2000. The Expo hold in spring every year and always locate on Wulaokeng, Su'ao. The spindle of Expo normally has three parts and there are agricultural life, ecological conservation, sustainable future. It attracts 300~400 thousand people every year in average.

== Transportation ==
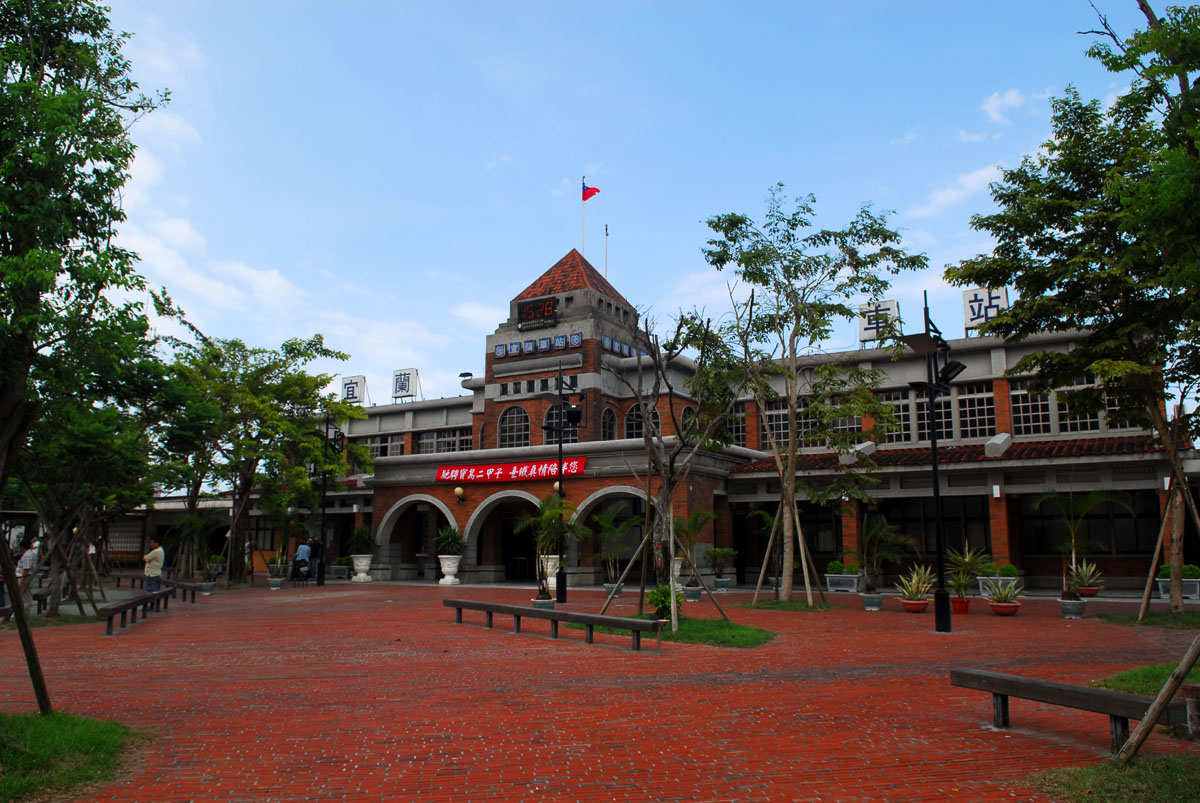
Yilan Station

=== Rail ===
The Yilan Line and North-Link Line of Taiwan Railway pass the county. Train stations within the two lines in the county are Shicheng, Dali, Daxi, Guishan, Wai-ao, Toucheng, Dingpu, Jiaoxi, Sicheng, Yilan, Erjie, Zhongli, Luodong, Dongshan, Xinma, Su'aoxin, Su'ao, Yongle, Dong-ao, Wuta and Hanben Station.

On 21 October 2018, it was the site of a train derailment that killed 18 passengers and injured 178.

=== Ports and Harbour ===
Yilan County's principal commercial seaport is Su'ao Port, a natural harbour in Su'ao Township. It serves as the principal maritime gateway of the Lanyang Region and also one of the four major naval base of the ROC Navy. The large-scale development of the port was untaken at the 1970s as one of the Taiwan's Ten Major Construction Projects. It has 14 berths and can be accommodate to cargo vessels up to 70,000 tonnes.

The county includes several fish ports including the Nanfang'ao Fishing Port and the Wushi Harbor.

== Notable residents ==
- Lin Huan-chang, children's literature writer and poet
- Lee Chih-kai, gymnast
- Kuo Hsing-chun, Taiwanese Amis weightlifter, Olympic gold medalist, five-time world champion

== See also ==
- List of Taiwanese superlatives
- Lungteh Shipbuilding
