= Lize Refuse Incinerator Plant =

Incinerator in Wujie, Yilan County, Taiwan

Lize Refuse Incinerator Plant 利澤垃圾焚化廠
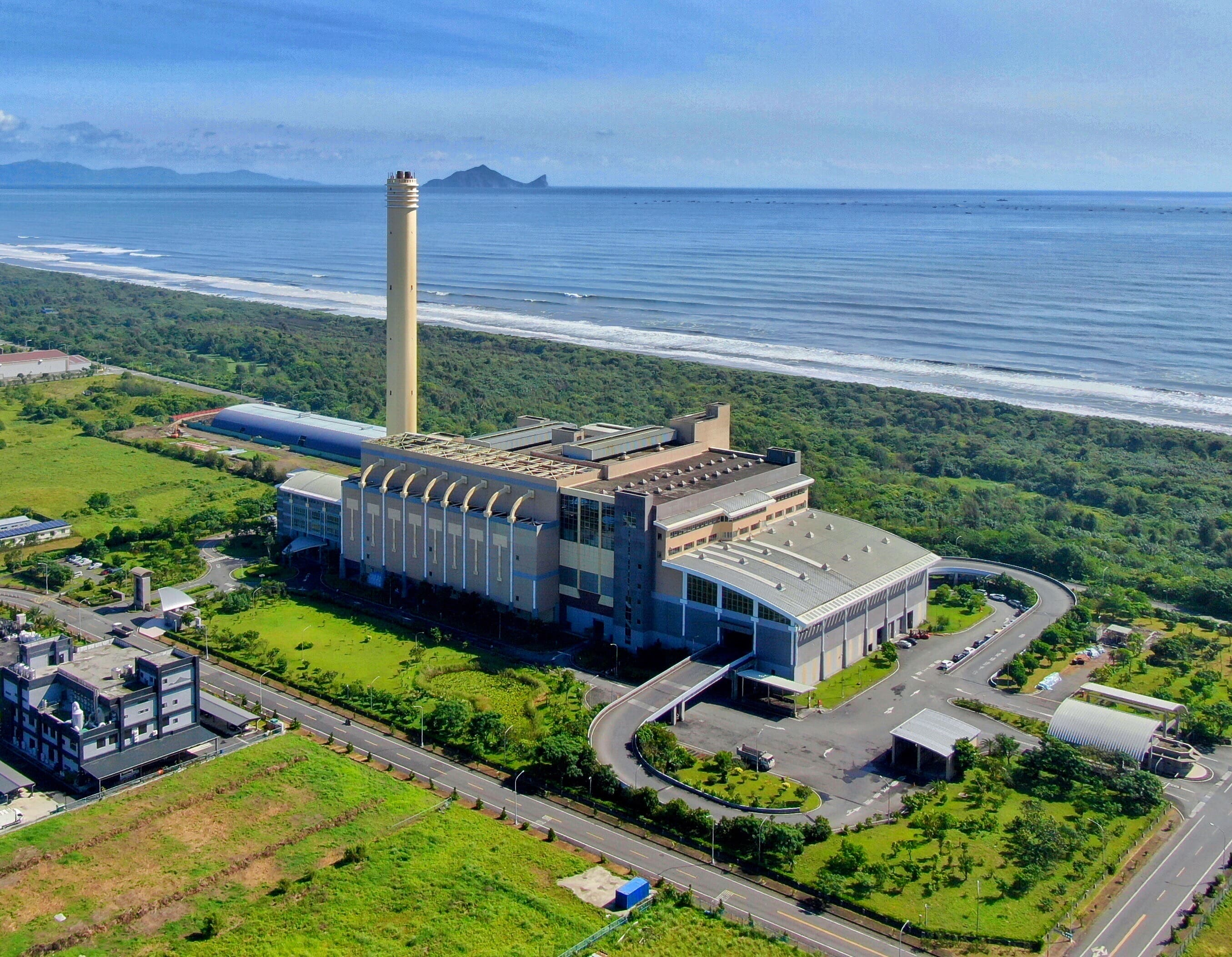
- Operated: 1996
- Location: Wujie, Yilan County, Taiwan
- Coordinates: 24°39′37.0″N 121°50′10.0″E
- Industry: waste management
- Style: incinerator
- Area: 10 ha (25 acres)

The Lize Refuse Incinerator Plant (traditional Chinese: 利澤垃圾焚化廠; simplified Chinese: 利泽垃圾焚化厂; pinyin: Lìzé Lèsè Fénhuà Chǎng) is an incinerator in Wujie Township, Yilan County, Taiwan.

== History ==
The incinerator was built in 1996 by the Environmental Protection Bureau of Yilan County Government.

== Architecture ==
The incinerator was built on a 10 hectares of land.

== Technical specifications ==
The incinerator has an annual recycling capacity of 150,000–200,000 tons of waste.

== See also ==
- Waste management in Taiwan
