= National Center for Traditional Arts =

Art center in Yilan, Taiwan

National Center for Traditional Arts 國立傳統藝術中心
- Interactive map of National Center for Traditional Arts 國立傳統藝術中心
- Location: Wujie, Yilan County, Taiwan
- Coordinates: 24.7031°N 121.8204°E
- Opened: January 2002
- Area: 24 ha (59 acres)
- Website: ncfta.gov.tw

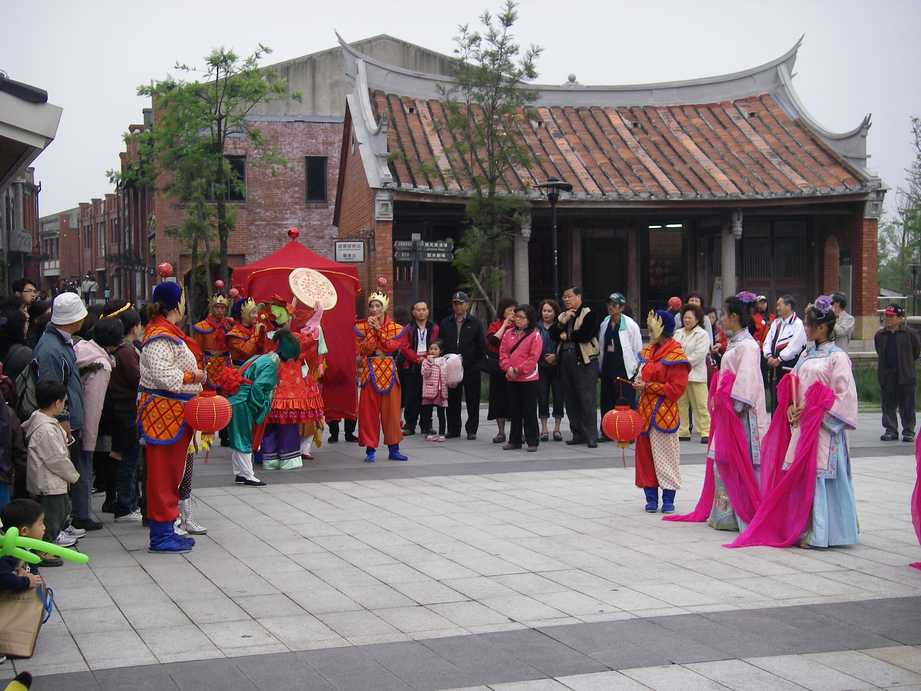
The students' performance of Taiwanese Opera in the National Center for Traditional Arts.

The National Center for Traditional Arts (NCFTA; Chinese: 國立傳統藝術中心; pinyin: Guólì Chuántǒng Yìshù Zhōngxīn) or also called Center for Traditional Arts is located by the river bank of Dongshan River in Wujie Township, Yilan County, Taiwan.

The center's total area is 24 hectares. The goal of the center is overall planning, supporting the related research, promoting, preserving, and teaching the traditional arts, and also redefining, renovating, and developing the traditional arts. The park itself has become one of the most important tourist spots in Yilan.

== History ==
The center was established in January 2002 as one of the agency of the Council for Cultural Affairs (CCA). On 5 February 2005, the Cultural Heritage Preservation Act was amended which effectively made the NCFTA the authority for traditional arts and folk customs related to cultural artifacts. In 2007, CCA established the Preparatory Office of Cultural Heritage Administration in which some staffs of NCFTA were transferred to the new office. In December 2015, Association for Relations Across the Taiwan Straits President Chen Deming toured the center during his 7-day visit around Taiwan.

== Organizational structures ==
- Overall planning division
- Performing arts development division
- Operation and promotion division

== See also ==
- List of museums in Taiwan
