= Erjie railway station =

Railway station in Yilan County, Taiwan

Erjie Station 二結車站
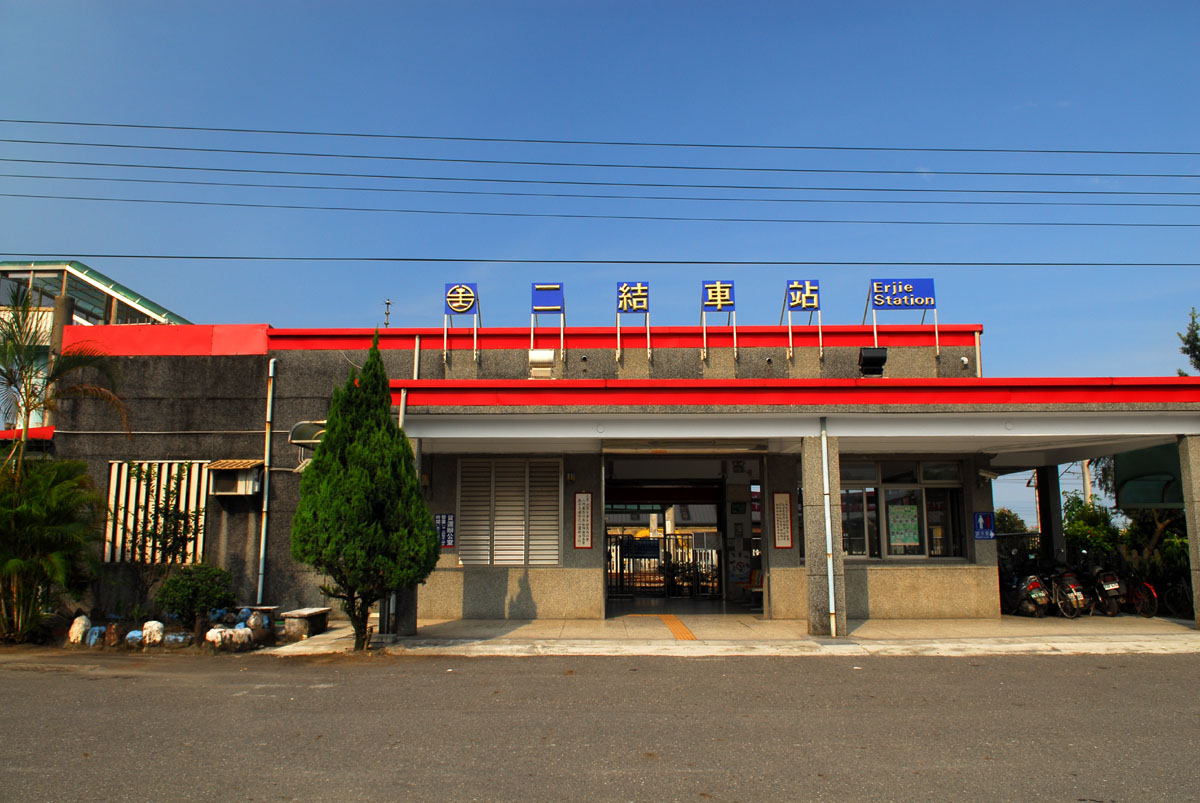

General information
- Location: Wujie, Yilan County, Taiwan
- Coordinates: 24°42′20.04″N 121°46′26.52″E
- System: Train station
- Owner: Taiwan Railway Corporation
- Operator: Taiwan Railway Corporation
- Line: Eastern Trunk line
- Train operators: Taiwan Railway Corporation

History
- Opened: 24 March 1919

Passengers
- 253 daily (2024)

Services
Preceding station	Taiwan Railway	Following station
Yilan towards Badu	Eastern Trunk line	Zhongli towards Taitung
Location

Erjie (Chinese: 二結車站; pinyin: Èrjié Chēzhàn) is a railway station on the Taiwan Railway Yilan line located in Wujie Township, Yilan County, Taiwan.

== History ==
The station was opened on 24 March 1919.

== Around the station ==
- Erjie Rice Barn

== See also ==
- List of railway stations in Taiwan
