= Erjie Rice Barn =

Former barn in Wujie, Yilan County, Taiwan

- 二結農會穀倉
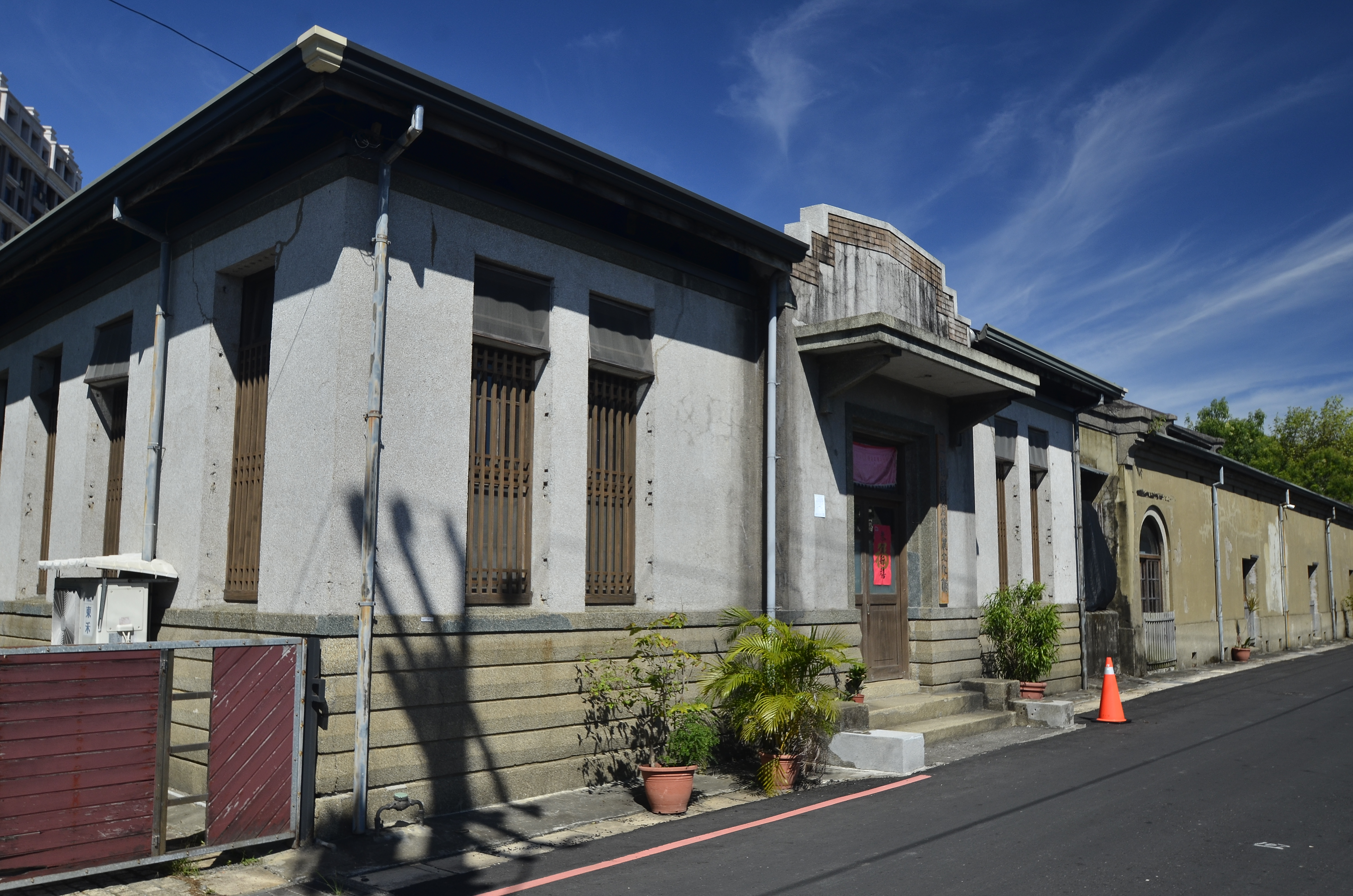
- Interactive map of the Erjie Rice Barn area
- Former names: Erjie Peasant Association Barn

General information
- Type: former barn
- Location: 171 Sanxing Xi Lu, Wujie, Yilan County, Taiwan
- Coordinates: 24°42′18.7″N 121°46′28.8″E
- Completed: 1928

Technical details
- Floor area: 3,000 m^{2}

The Erjie Rice Barn, also known as the Erjie Peasant Association Barn, (traditional Chinese: 二結農會穀倉; simplified Chinese: 二结农会谷仓; pinyin: Èrjié Nónghuì Gǔcāng) is a former barn in Wujie Township, Yilan County, Taiwan.

== History ==
The Erjie Rice Barn was built in 1928, when Taiwan was under Japanese rule. In 1935, a large brick storage warehouse and a mill were added to store public grain in the Wujie Township area. The warehouses were expanded in 1937 and 1953. During the Second World War, the Erjie Peasant Association Barn was responsible for purchasing rice on the south bank of the Lanyang River. In 1993, the barn ceased to be used for rice storage .

The Erjie Rice Barn was announced as a county-level monument on 12 August 1998. Its upkeep is currently entrusted to the Erjie Cultural Foundation. Recently, the barn was renovated into a venue for cultural preservation.

== Architecture ==
The barn spans over an area of 3,000 m^{2}.

== Exhibitions ==
The barn displays the early original tools used for agricultural activities at that time, including a 3-story high rice huller.

== Transportation ==
The barn is accessible from Erjie Station of Taiwan Railway.

== Gallery ==
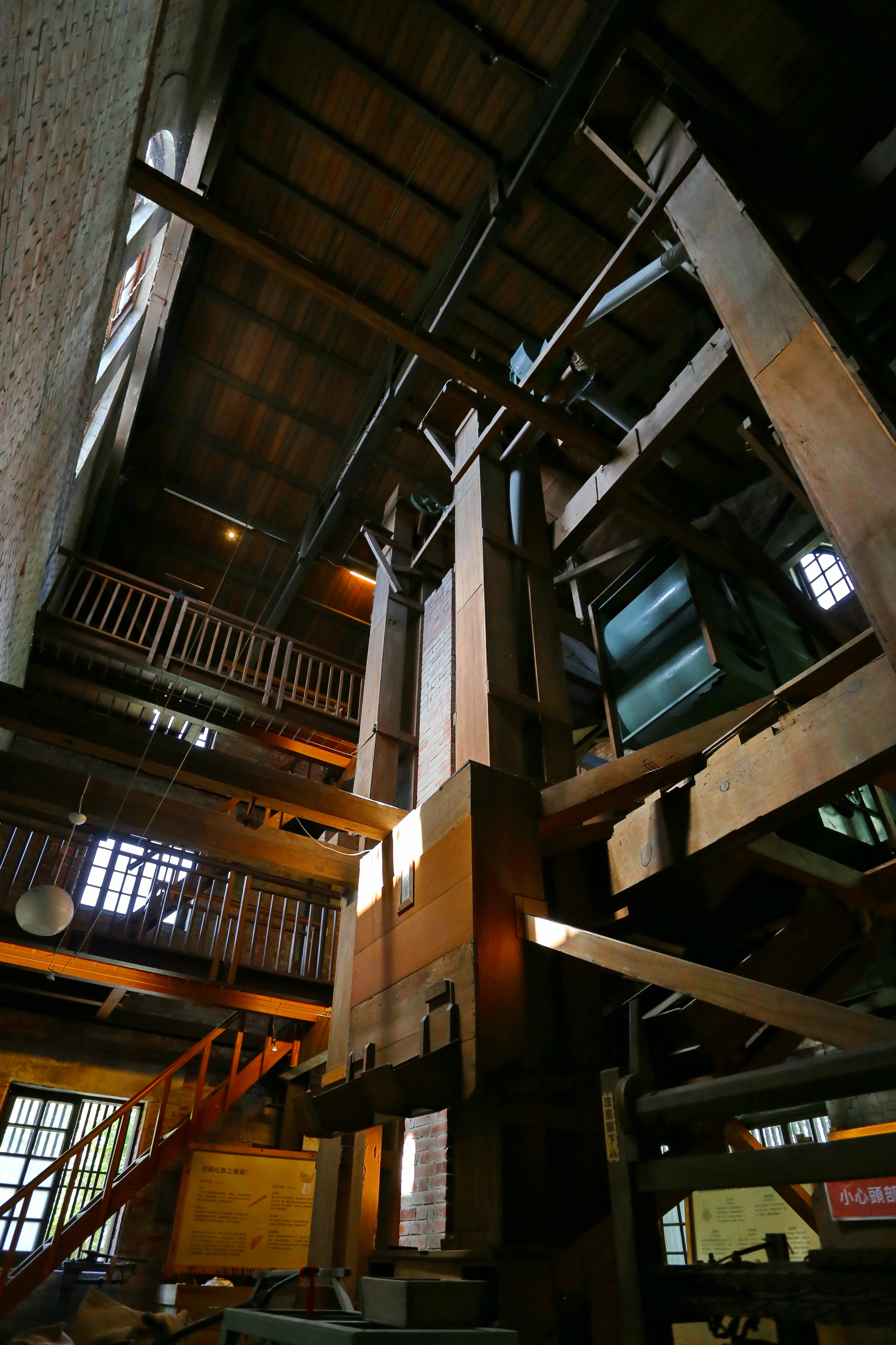

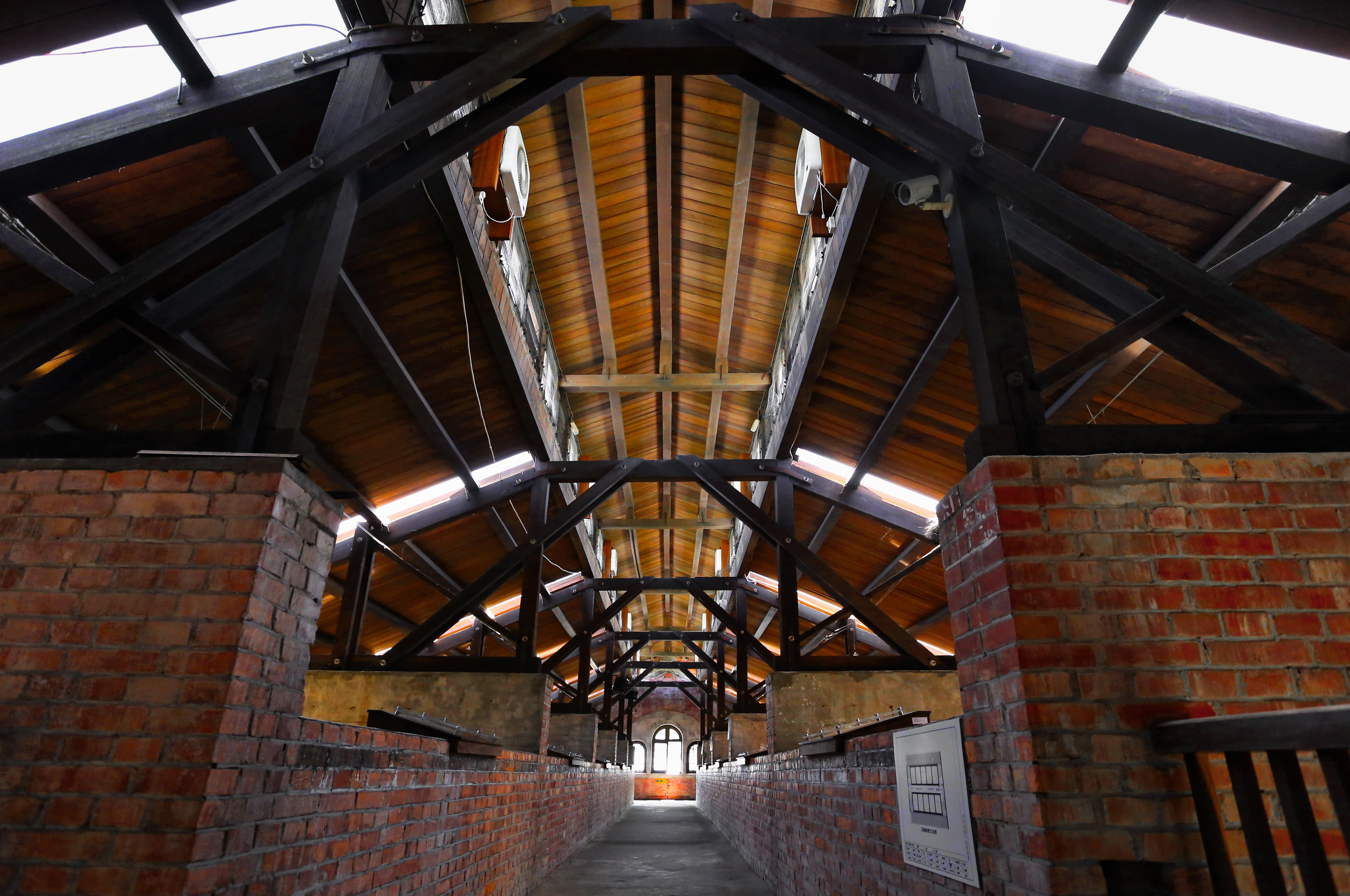

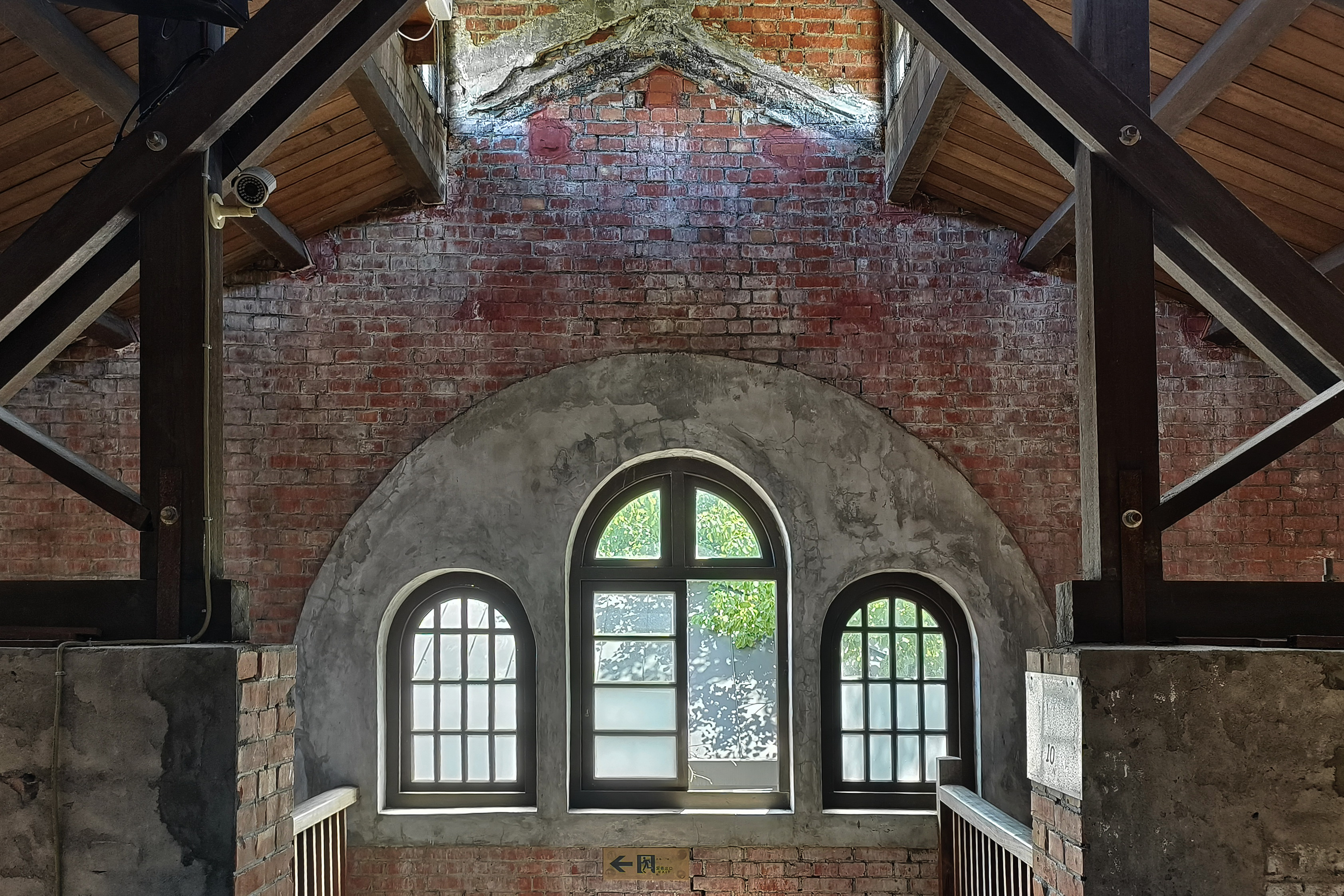

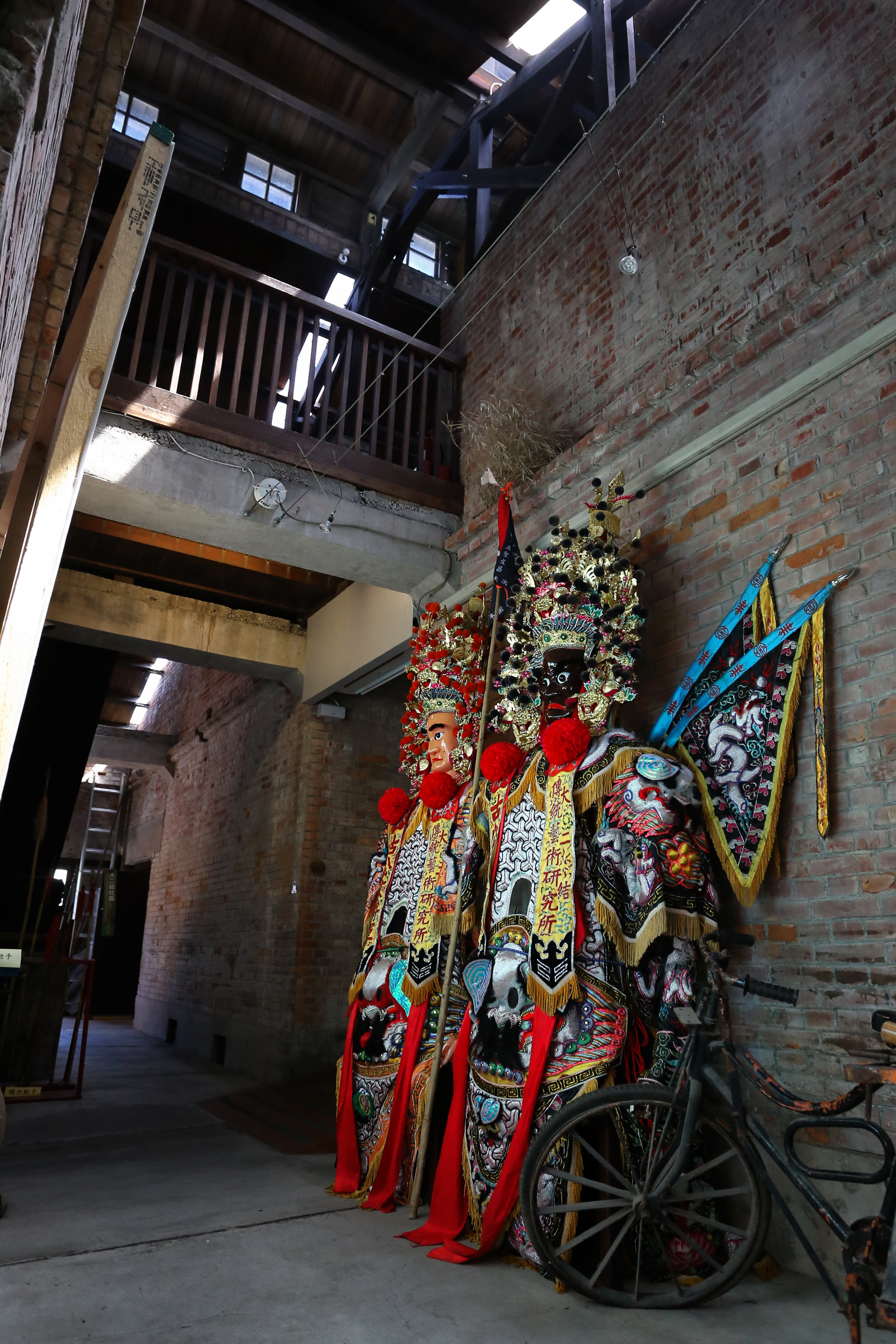

== See also ==
- List of tourist attractions in Taiwan
