= Lin Huan-chang =

Taiwanese writer

Lin Huan-chang (Chinese: 林煥彰; born August 16, 1939), a native of Chiaohsi, Yilan, Taiwan, is a children's literature writer and poet with pen names Mu-yun (牧雲), To-fo (多佛), and Fang ke-pai (方克白). He has written poetry, essays, historical materials, reviews, and children's literature, and his works have been translated into multiple languages. In 1970, he won the Chinese Writers & Artists Association's (中國文藝協會) Culture and Art Award Award, which established Lin's firm position in the field of new poetry.

In his youth, Lin Huan-chang was exposed to the monthly magazine New New Literature (新新文藝), where he became acquainted with genres such as new poetry, essays, and short stories. This had a profound impact on him and eventually led to his decision to start writing. During his military service, Lin participated in the China Literary Correspondence School Military Literary Class (中國文藝函授學校軍中文藝班) poetry group, where he began to learn how to write new poetry. After his discharge, he attended the Chinese Writers & Artists Association's Literary Research Class poetry group, where he met people like Chi Hsien (紀弦), Cheng Chou-yu, and Ya Hsien.

== Activities ==
In 1964, Lin made his first submission, with the short poem "Cloud" (雲) appearing in the fourth issue of The Vineyard Poetry Quarterly (葡萄園詩刊). From then on, Lin Huan-chang's works could be seen in every issue of The Vineyard Poetry Quarterly, and he became close friends with people like Guan Guan and Chou Meng-tieh. In 1965, Lin was introduced to the Li Poetry Society (笠詩社) by Li Kuei-hsien. In 1971, he co-founded the Dragon Poetry Society (龍族詩社) with Hsin Mu (辛牧), Chen Fang-ming (陳芳明), Hsiao Hsiao (蕭蕭), and Su Shao-lien, and published the Dragon Monthly (龍族月刊).

In 1978, Lin Huan-chang won the Sun Yat-sen Literature and Arts Art and Literature Award in the Children's Literature category for his works Childhood Dreams (童年的夢) and My Sister's Red Dance Shoes (妹妹的紅舞鞋), making him the first winner in this category. After that, Lin became more actively involved in children's literature. In 1991, he founded the Children's Literature Quarterly (兒童文學家季刊) on his own. He has also organized The Society of Children's Literature, The R.O.C. (中華民國兒童文學學會), and the Mainland China Children's Literature Research Association (大陸兒童文學研究會). He has served as the first chairman of the China Straits-Rim Children's Literature Research Association (中國海峽兩岸兒童文學研究會) and the first director of the World Chinese Children's Literature Documentation Center (世界華文兒童文學資料館).
