= Wujie, Yilan =

Rural township in Yilan County, Taiwan

Coordinates: 24°42′N 121°47′E

Wujie Township 五結鄉 Goketsu
- Rural township
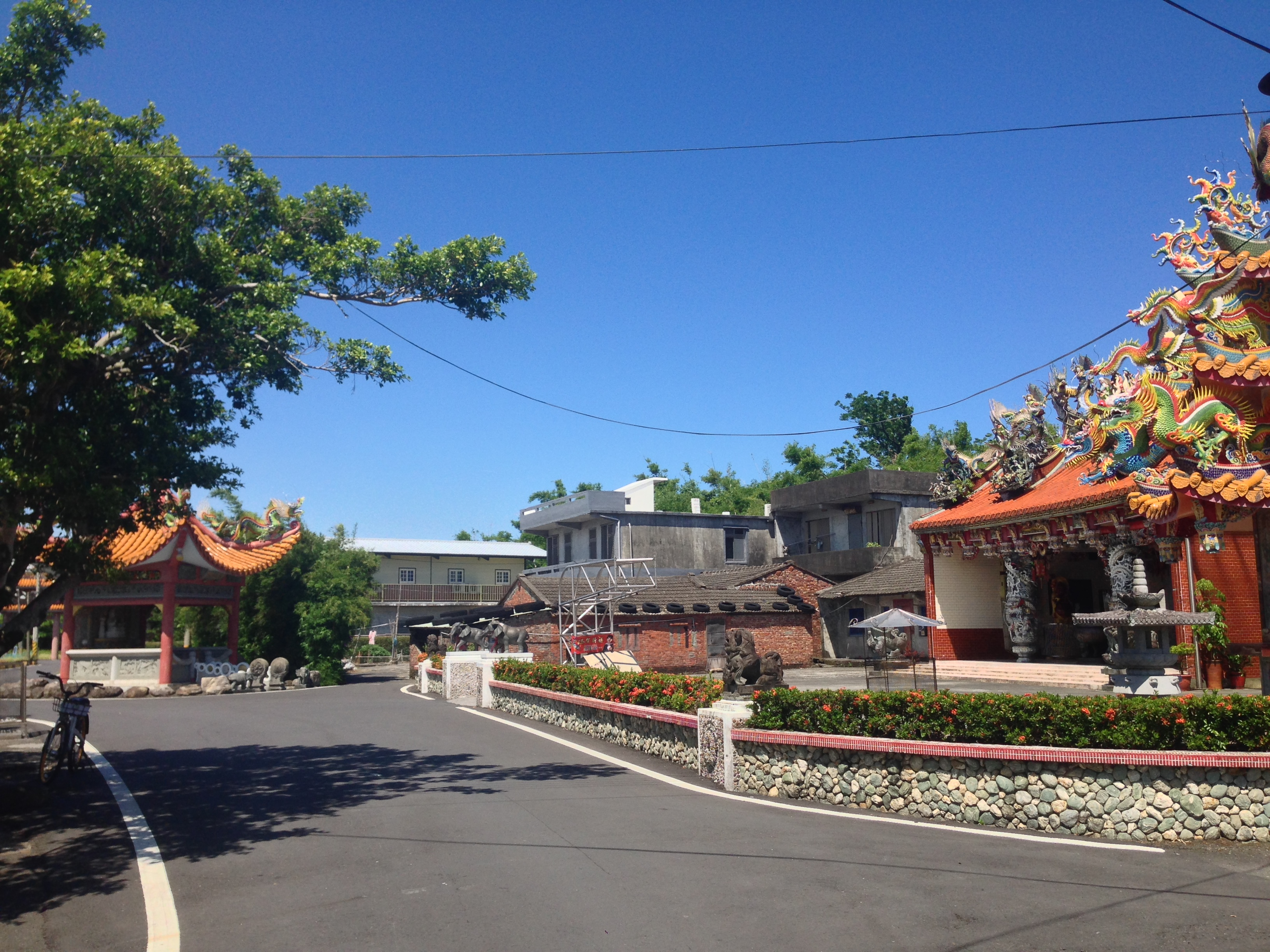

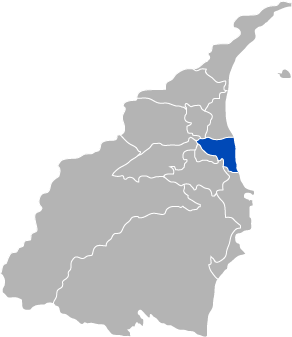
- Wujie Township in Yilan County
- Location: Yilan County, Taiwan

Area
  - Total: 38.87 km^{2} (15.01 sq mi)

Population (September 2023)
  - Total: 40,984
  - Density: 1,054/km^{2} (2,731/sq mi)
- Website: ilwct.e-land.gov.tw (in Chinese)

Wujie Township (Chinese: 五結鄉; pinyin: Wǔjié Xiāng; Wade–Giles: Wu^{3}-chieh^{2} Hsiang^{1}; Pe̍h-ōe-jī: Gō͘-kiat Hiong) is a rural township in the eastern part of Yilan County, Taiwan.

== Geography ==
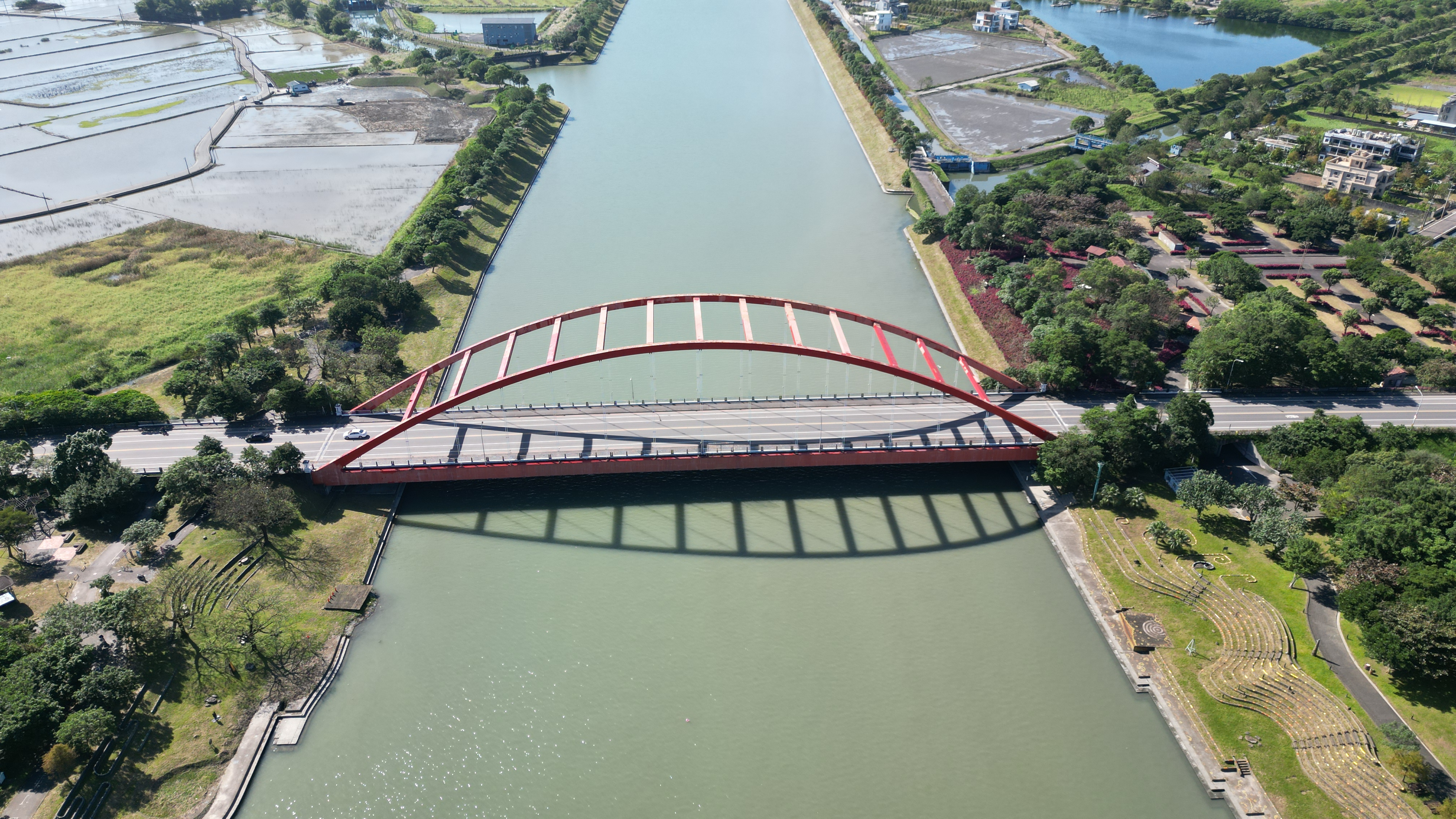
Aerial perspective of the bridge across Dongshan river. Shot December 2022.

- Area: 38.87 km^{2}
- Population: 40,984 people (September 2023)

== Administrative divisions ==
The township comprises 15 villages: Chengxing, Daji, Erjie, Fuxing, Jinzhong, Jixin, Lize, Sanxing, Shangsi, Sijie, Wujie, Xiaowei, Xiehe, Zengan and Zhongxing.

== Tourist attractions ==
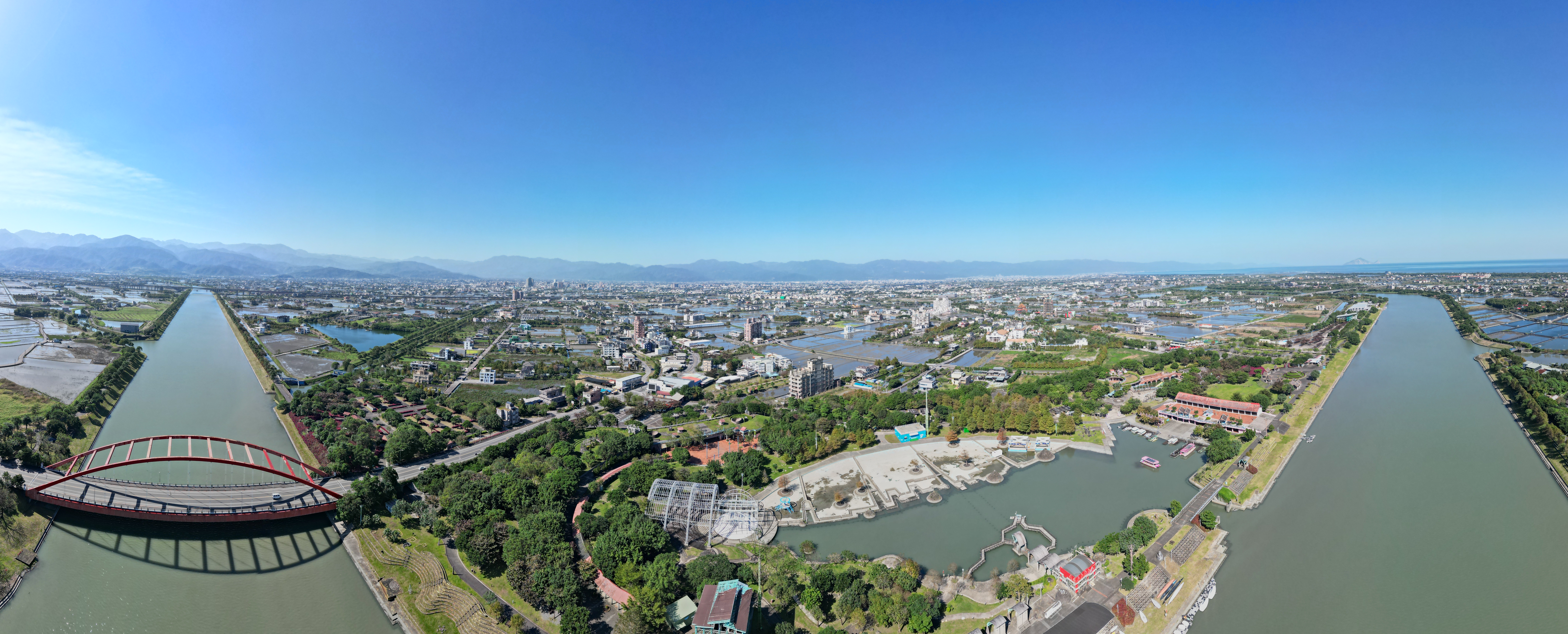
Aerial panorama of Dongshan River. Shot December 2022.

- Chung Hsing Cultural and Creative Park
- Dongshan River Water Park
- Erjie Rice Barn
- Lizejian Yong'an Temple
- National Center for Traditional Arts

== Festivals ==
- Yilan International Children's Folklore and Folkgame Festival

== Transportation ==
The Erjie Station and Zhongli Station of Taiwan Railway is located in the township.

== Notable natives ==
- Lin Yi-hsiung, Chairperson of Democratic Progressive Party (1998–2000)
