= Zhongli railway station (Yilan) =

Railway station in Wujie, Yilan County, Taiwan

Zhongli Station 中里車站
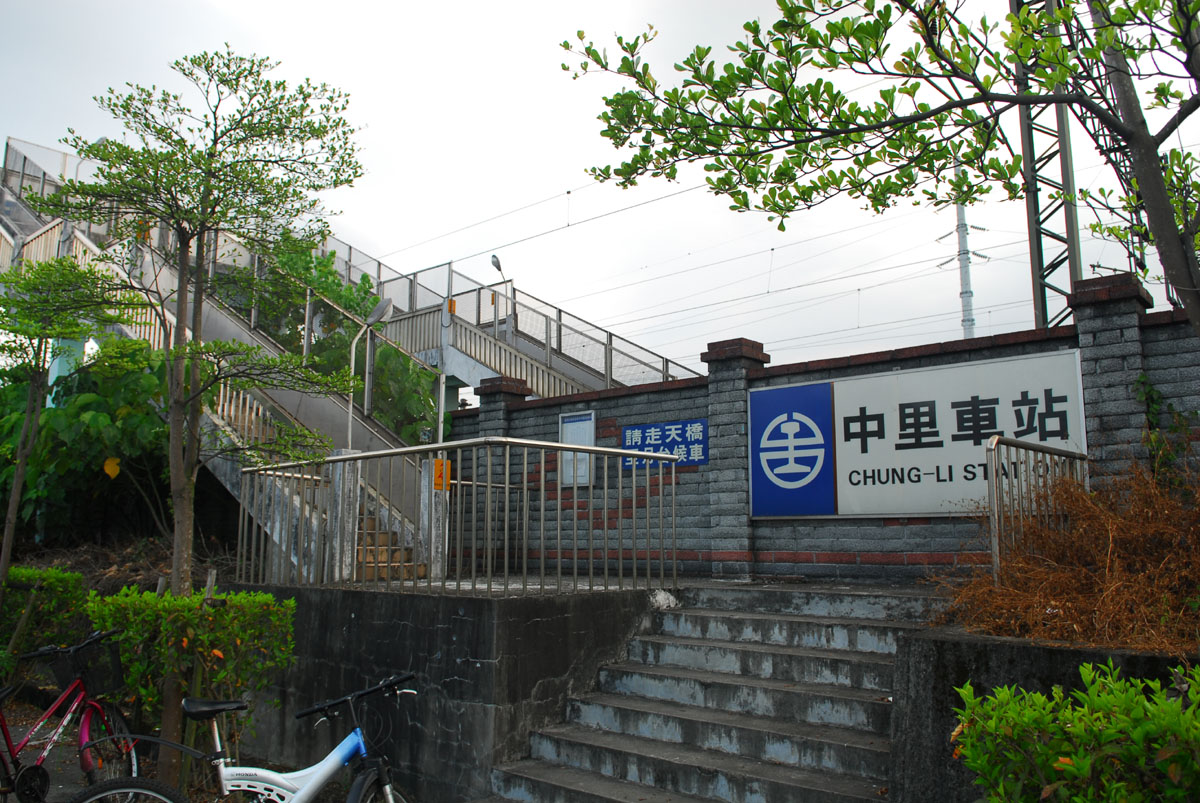

General information
- Location: Wujie, Yilan County, Taiwan
- Coordinates: 24°41′37.32″N 121°46′30.12″E
- System: Train station
- Owner: Taiwan Railway Corporation
- Operator: Taiwan Railway Corporation
- Line: Eastern Trunk line
- Train operators: Taiwan Railway Corporation

History
- Opened: 20 July 1936

Services
Preceding station	Taiwan Railway	Following station
Erjie towards Badu	Eastern Trunk line	Luodong towards Taitung
Location

Zhongli (Chinese: 中里車站; pinyin: Zhōnglǐ Chēzhàn) is a railway station on the Taiwan Railway Yilan line. It is located in Wujie Township, Yilan County, Taiwan.

== History ==
The station was opened on 20 July 1936.

== Around the station ==
- Chung Hsing Cultural and Creative Park

== See also ==
- List of railway stations in Taiwan
