= Dongshan River Water Park =

Park in Wujie, Yilan County, Taiwan

- 冬山河親水公園
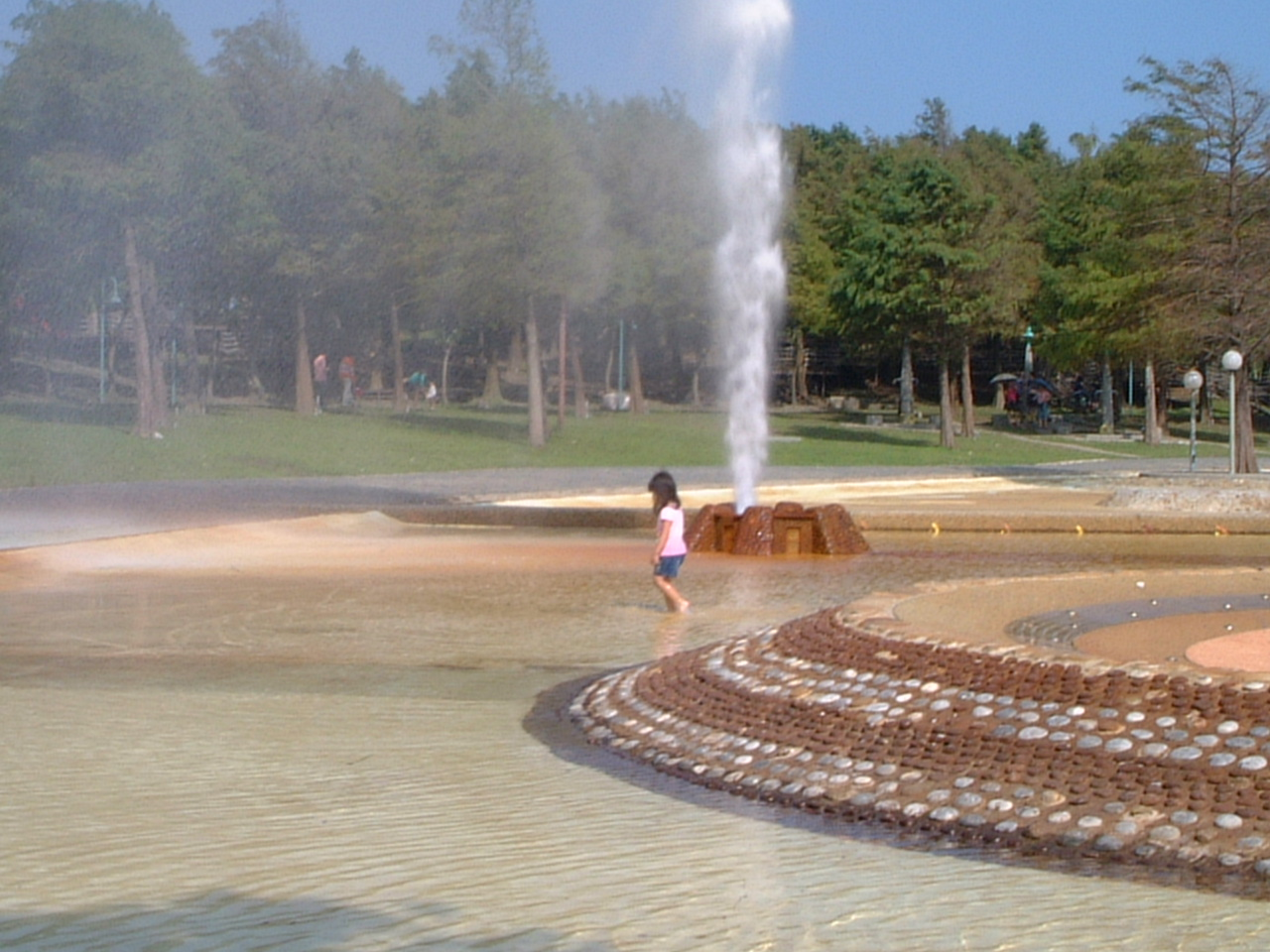
- Interactive map of Dongshan River Water Park
- Type: Water park
- Location: Wujie, Yilan County, Taiwan
- Coordinates: 24°40′22.5″N 121°48′53.4″E
- Opened: 1993

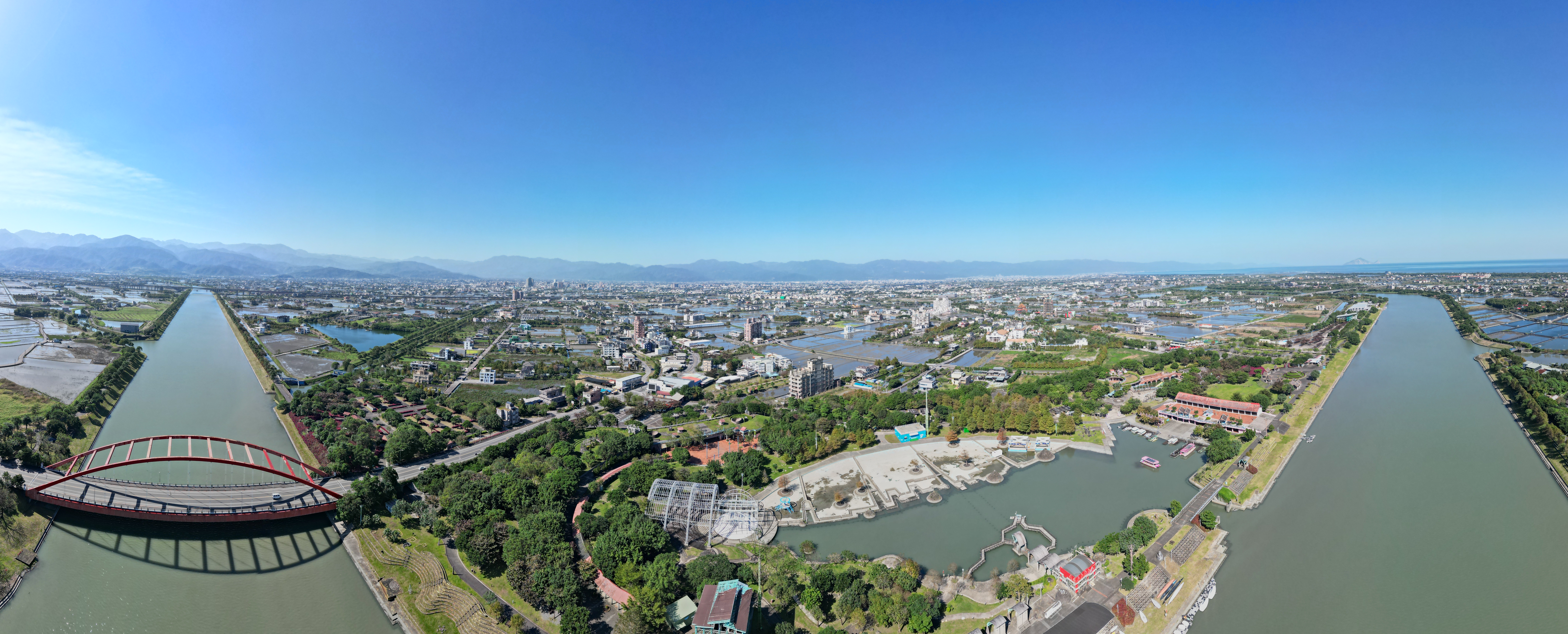
Aerial panorama of Dongshan River. Shot December 2022.

Dongshan River Water Park (Chinese: 冬山河親水公園; pinyin: Dōngshānhé Qīnshuǐ Gōngyuán), established in 1993, is located in Wujie Township, Yilan County, Taiwan, on the banks of the Dongshan River. Its slogan is "Near water, Have green" (親近水、擁有綠). It is one of Taiwan's most famous scenic spots. The Yilan International Children's Folklore and Folkgame Festival was held in the park annually until 2007. Due to SARS, the festival was cancelled in 2003.

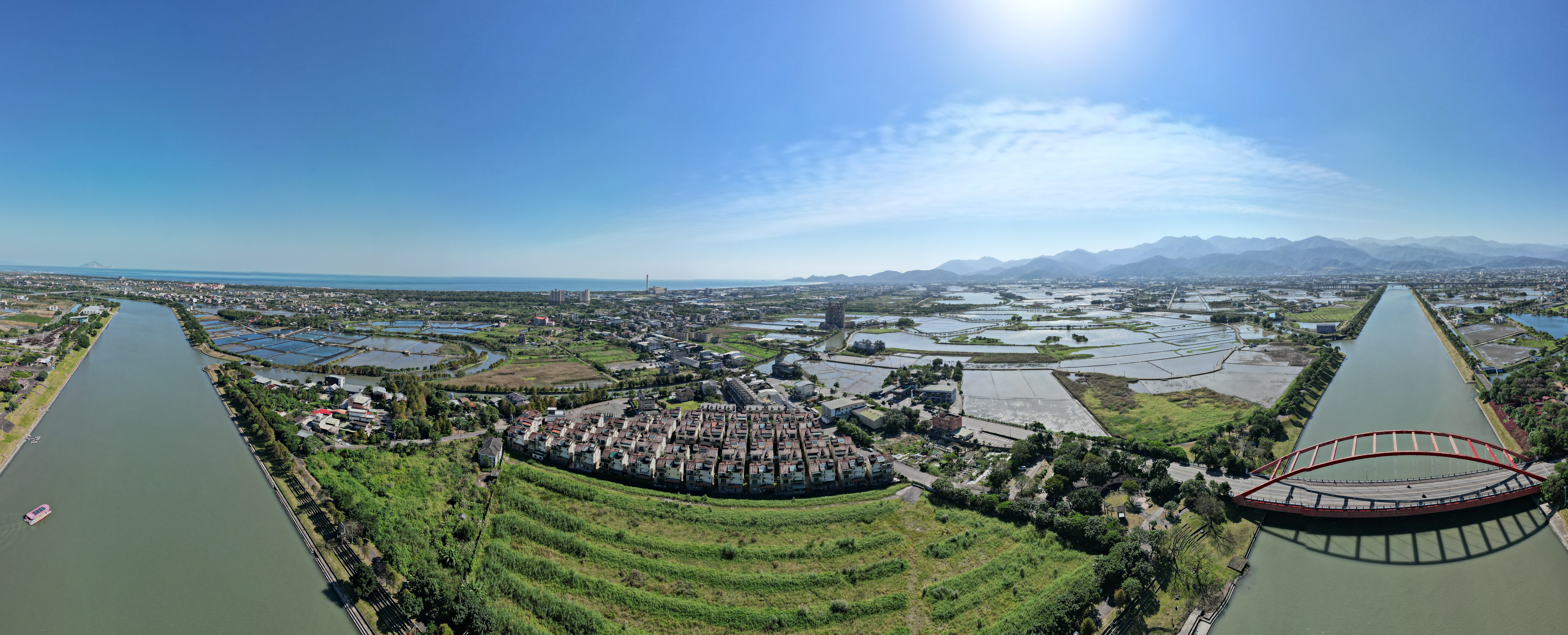
Aerial panorama of Dongshan River facing southeast. Shot December 2022.

== Transportation ==
The park is accessible from Luodong Station of Taiwan Railway.

== See also ==
- List of parks in Taiwan
