= Yilan Plain =

Plain in Northeast Taiwan

Yilan Plain 宜蘭平原
- Plain
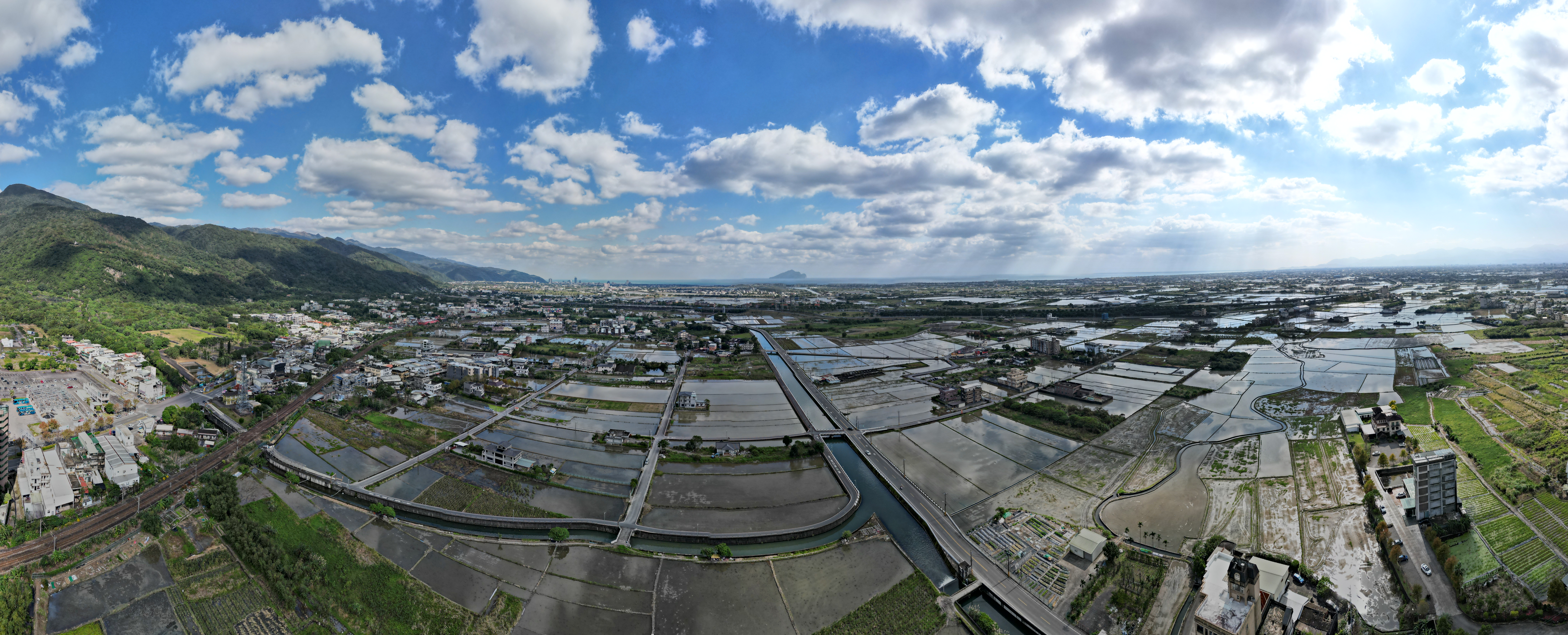
- Rice fields at Jiaoxi

- Location within Taiwan
- Coordinates: 24°42′56″N 121°47′3″E
- Location: Yilan County, Taiwan
- Geology: Plain

Yilan Plain (Chinese: 宜蘭平原; pinyin: Yilán Píngyuán), also called the Lanyang Plain (蘭陽平原), or historically Kabalan (Chinese: 蛤仔難; Pe̍h-ōe-jī: Kap-á-lān), Kapsulan (蛤仔蘭; Kap-chú-lân), Komalan (噶瑪蘭; Kat-má-lán), is a plain in Yilan County, Taiwan. The plain has an alluvial fan which formed by the Lanyang River. The plain was formed in the shape of nearly equilateral triangle. The broad and flat feature of this plan has made transportation so convenient in the region which drew large population to the towns and cities in the area.

The plain was inhabited by the Kavalans, an aboriginal group which mostly had migrated to southern places, such as Hualien and Taitung.

== See also ==
- Yilan County, Taiwan
- Geography of Taiwan
