= Dongshan River =

River in Taiwan

Coordinates: 24°40′03.1″N 121°48′41.1″E

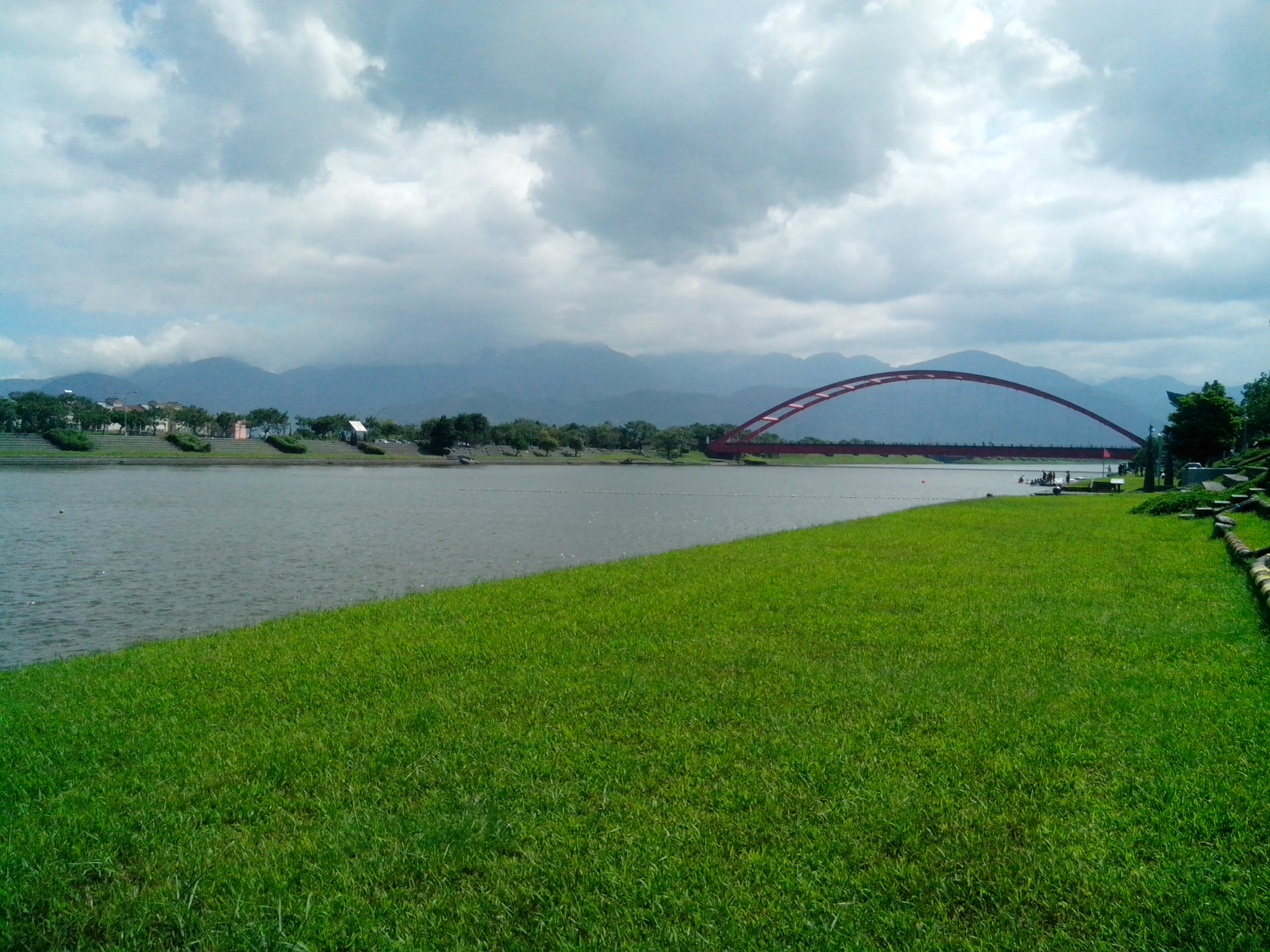
- Native name: 冬山河 (Chinese)

Location
- Location: Yilan County, Taiwan

Physical characteristics
- Length: 24 km (15 mi)

The Dongshan River (Chinese: 冬山河; pinyin: Dōngshān Hé; Wade–Giles: Tung^{1}-shan^{1} Ho^{2}; Pe̍h-ōe-jī: Tang-soaⁿ-hô) is a river in northeast Taiwan. It flows through Yilan County for 24 kilometers.

== Facilities ==
A bicycle path runs along the riverside.

== Parks ==
There are two parks on the banks of the Dongshan River: Dongshan River Water Park and Dongshan River Ecoark.

== See also ==
- List of rivers in Taiwan
- National Center for Traditional Arts
