= Yilan International Children's Folklore and Folkgame Festival =

Artistic festival in Taiwan

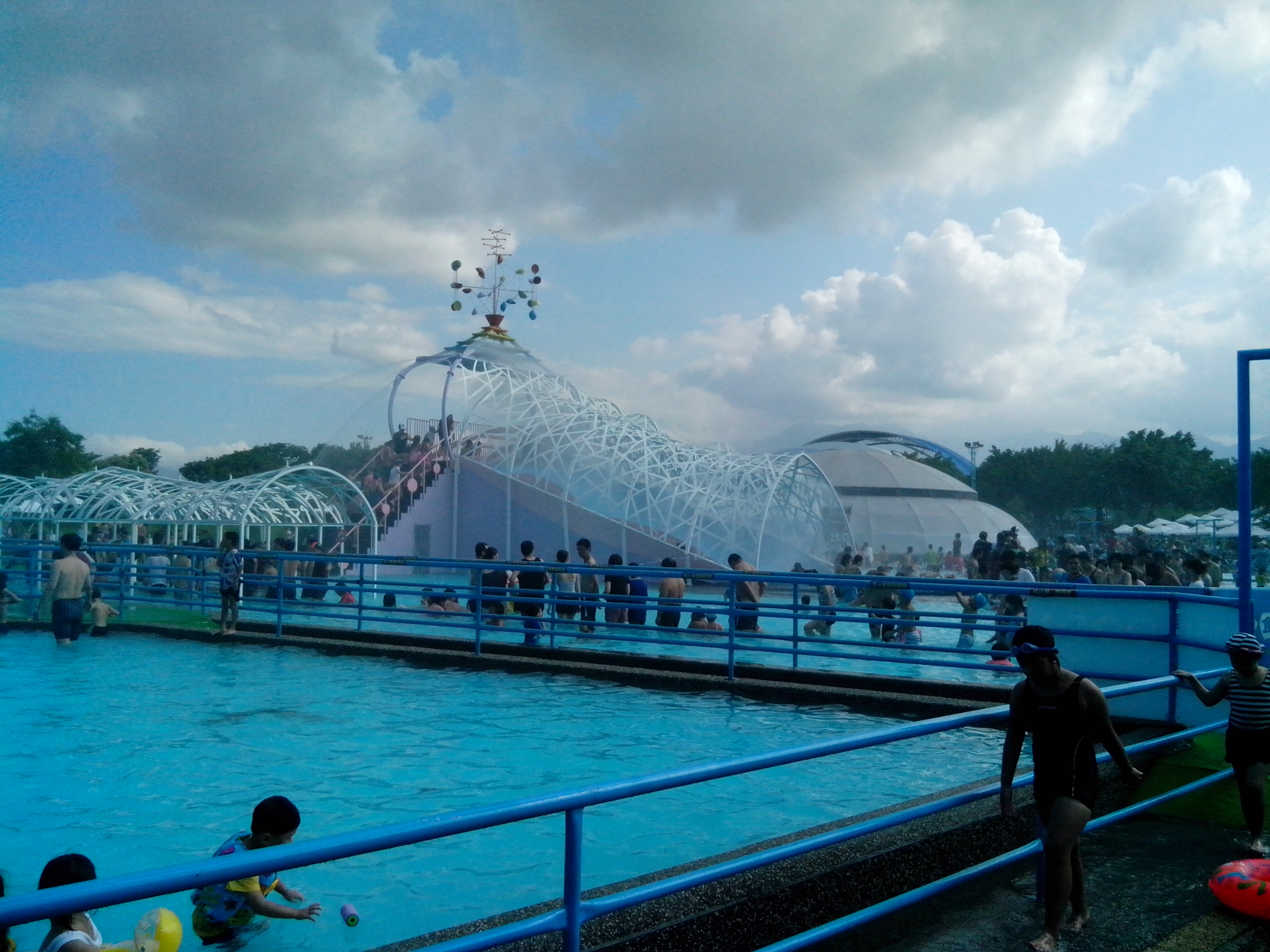
2013 Yilan International Children's Folklore and Folkgame Festival

The Yilan International Children's Folklore and Folkgame Festival (YICFFF; Chinese: 宜蘭國際童玩藝術節) is an artistic festival in Taiwan, which has taken place during the summer vacation each year at the Dongshan River Water Park in Yilan County since 1996.

- The festival was canceled in 2003 due to the outbreak of SARS.
- Completion of the Hsuehshan Tunnel in 2006 made going to the YICFFF more convenient.
- The government of Yilan announced the festival's cancellation in 2007.
- The festival will be held again from July 3 to August 15, 2010, as the DPP has again taken over the position as the government of Yilan since 2009.

== Closing down ==
Yilan County Government announced on 8 August 2007 YICFFF would no longer be held due to a substantial loss of visitors and funds. This marked the end of the YICFFF, 12 years after it began.

=== Save YICFFF actions ===
The news about YICFFF's official cancellation drew objections from many people including the people in Yilan in the tourism industry as well as the citizens of Yilan in general. YICFFF will be held again in 2010 as the DPP has again taken over the position as the government of Yilan since 2009.

== Restorative ==
Since Yilan residence have not been able to consistently support this event due to political change and conflict, the party has made changes to eliminate the possibility of any further interruptions.

This Yilan International Children's Folklore and Folkgame Festival was restored in 2010 as new magistrate Lin Tsung-hsien was elected.

In 2011, forty performing groups from over twenty countries participated in the festival. Several iterations of the revived festival continued to be highly attended.

The festival was cancelled in 2020 due to the COVID-19 pandemic.
