= Siyuan Pass =

Mountain pass in central Taiwan

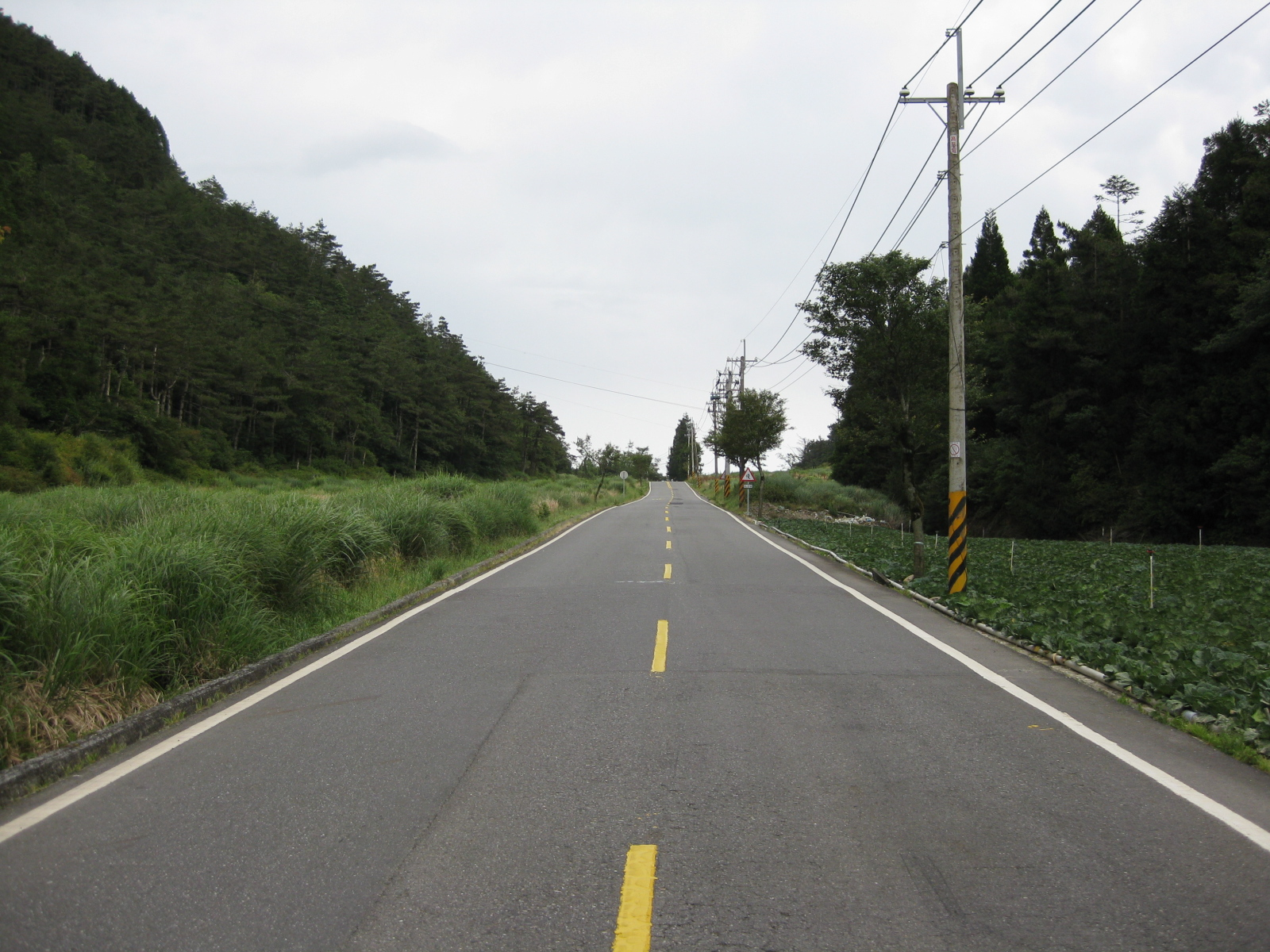
- Looking north toward Siyuan Pass

- Location within Taiwan
- Elevation: 1,948 metres (6,391 ft)
- Traversed by: Provincial Highway 7A

Third Approach
- Location: Datong, Yilan, Taiwan
- Range: Central Mountain Range
- Coordinates: 24°23′48″N 121°21′24″E

Siyuan Pass (Chinese: 思源埡口; pinyin: Sīyuán Wùkǒu, el. 1,948 m), formerly known as Piyanan Saddle (匹亞南鞍部), is a mountain pass in Datong Township, Yilan County, Taiwan. It is located along Provincial Highway 7A near the border of Taichung City.
