= Cherry Orchard Cemetery =

Cemetery in Taiwan

Cherry Orchard Cemetery (櫻花陵園)
- Interactive map of Cherry Orchard Cemetery (櫻花陵園)

Details
- Established: 2009
- Coordinates: 24°49′23″N 121°42′9″E

Cherry Orchard Cemetery(櫻花陵園) is located in the mountainous area of Pao-Lun Village(匏崙村), Jiaoxi, Yilan, Taiwan, with an elevation of approximately 750 to 800 meters. The cemetery spans 45.6 hectares and officially opened in 2009. It is a public cemetery managed by the Yilan County Government's Funeral Management Department. The design was created by the architect Huang Sheng-yuan (黃聲遠) and his team, Tian Zhongyang Architectural Firm. Additionally, Chiang Wei-shui(蔣渭水) is buried here.

The planning of Cherry Orchard Cemetery began in 1999 with an investment of NT$846 million. The planning work started during the tenure of Yilan County Magistrate Liu Shou-cheng (劉守成)and was officially opened in 2009.

Cherry Orchard Cemetery offers a panoramic view of the entire Lanyang Plain, with distant views of the Pacific Ocean and Guishan Island. The cemetery is also planted with a large number of cherry blossoms, which bloom every year in February to March. The unique architectural style and landscape design have made it a popular photo spot in recent years. According to initial statistics from the management staff, about a thousand visitors and families come to visit and take photos on weekends, and there is also a steady flow of visitors on weekdays.

== Design ==
The architectural design of Cherry Orchard Cemetery primarily uses cast-in-place concrete as the main building material and is planned according to the hillside terrain, showcasing brutalist aesthetic features, with the texture of the molds preserved to present a natural feel. The buildings in the park integrate slanted walls and geometric streamlined corridors, giving the overall space a more modern and layered feel.

The interior of the columbarium is partially designed with natural lighting to maintain the solemn and tranquil atmosphere of the space. Additionally, to reduce the psychological pressure on visitors, no photos are placed in the niches of the columbarium. Among them, the columbarium in Zone D won the Best Work Award at the Taiwan Residential Architecture Award in 2010.

== Wei Shui Hill ==
Wei Shui Hill (渭水之丘) is located at the highest point of the cemetery and was established to commemorate Chiang Wei-shui. Designed by Huang Sheng-yuan in a minimalist and poetic style, it features an elliptical small square (about 20 meters by 13 meters), with the shape organically extending along the contour lines. The design follows the hillside's contour lines and slightly protrudes outward. This design won the first prize at the Taiwan Architecture Award.

The cemetery does not feature tall memorials or extravagant decorations, which aligns with Chiang Wei-shui's advocacy for freedom, equality, and concern for the underprivileged during his lifetime. Behind the tomb is a sloping grassy area for people to rest and reflect. The cemetery also has a 300-meter-long Snow Valley Trail, named after Chiang Wei-shui's courtesy name "Xuegu" (雪谷).

Chiang Wei-shui was originally buried in Dazhi(大直), Taipei, and later reburied in the Liuzhangli Cemetery (六張犁亂葬崗)in Taipei City. To return his remains to his hometown, the Yilan County Government and Chiang Wei-shui's descendants held a reburial ceremony on October 17, 2015, moving his remains from Liuzhangli to his hometown in Yilan, where they were laid to rest in a specially designed "Wei Shui Hill" in Cherry Orchard Cemetery . The reburial ceremony was hosted by Yilan County Magistrate Lin Tsung-hsien and Taipei City Mayor Ko Wen-je(柯文哲), with Chiang Wei-shui's descendants in attendance. Taiwan Research Foundation(臺灣研究基金會) founder Huang Huang-hsiung(黃煌雄) also recited the poem "I Am at Wei Shui Hill" at the ceremony.

== Facilities and Burial Methods ==
Cherry Orchard Cemetery primarily offers columbarium services and mainly adopts burial methods. The cemetery offers three types of burial options: family-style columbarium, individual columbarium, and eco-friendly natural burial (tree burial). Among these, the family-style columbarium has niches that can hold 4 to 18 urns, and there is a large family columbarium that can accommodate up to 120 people, though the number of such plots is limited and many are already reserved. The individual columbarium offers independent columbarium corridors.
