= Lin Mao-sheng =

Taiwanese politician

- 林茂盛
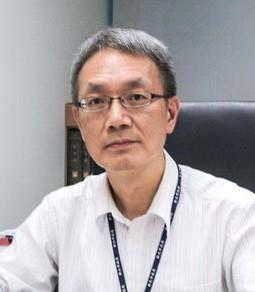
- Official portrait of Lin Mao-sheng

Acting Magistrate of Yilan
- Incumbent
- Assumed office 31 December 2024
- Preceded by: Lin Zi-miao

Deputy Magistrate of Yilan
- Incumbent
- Assumed office 25 December 2022
- Magistrate: Lin Zi-miao
- Preceded by: Lin Chien-jung

Personal details
- Party: Independent
- Education: National Taiwan University of Science and Technology (BS, MS); Soochow University (MA)

Lin Mao-sheng (Chinese: 林茂盛; pinyin: Lín Màoshèng; born c. 1967) is a Taiwanese politician.

Lin holds dual master's degrees in engineering and law. He worked for the Taipei City Government and under Wu Tze-cheng at the Public Construction Commission before he was appointed secretary-general of the Yilan County Government during Lin Zi-miao's first term as county magistrate. As secretary-general, Lin commented on plans to extend the Taiwan High Speed Rail system to Yilan, a provisional motion passed by the Yilan County Council related to the Senkaku Islands dispute, and on legal actions against Lin Zi-miao. After Lin Zi-miao won a second term as Yilian County magistrate, she appointed Lin Mao-sheng deputy magistrate. Lin Zi-miao was sentenced to twelve years and six months in prison on 31 December 2024, and accordingly, the Ministry of the Interior appointed Lin Mao-sheng to serve as acting magistrate.
