= Chen Ou-po =

Taiwanese politician and engineer

Chen Ou-po MLY
- 陳歐珀
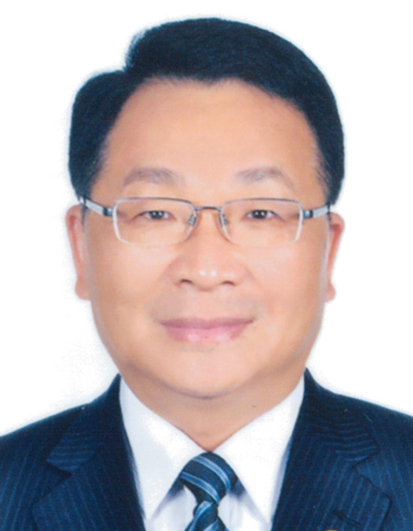
- Official portrait, 2019

Member of the Legislative Yuan
- In office 1 February 2012 – 31 January 2024
- Preceded by: Lin Chien-jung
- Succeeded by: Chen Chun-yu
- Constituency: Yilan County

Personal details
- Born: 12 October 1962 (age 63) Yilan County, Taiwan
- Party: Democratic Progressive Party
- Education: National Chung Hsing University (BS, MS); National Taiwan University (PhD)

Chen Ou-po (Chinese: 陳歐珀; pinyin: Chén Ōupò; born 12 October 1962) is a Taiwanese politician and engineer. A member of the Democratic Progressive Party, he served in the Legislative Yuan from 2012 to 2024, representing Yilan County.

== Education ==
After graduating from National Yilan Senior High School, Chen studied agricultural science at National Chung Hsing University, where he received a bachelor's degree and a master's degree in forestry in 1988. He wrote his master's thesis, "The effect of press drying on the properties of kraft sheet of Taiwan acacia," on the plant species acacia confusa. He then earned his Ph.D. in environmental engineering from National Taiwan University.

== Political career ==
Chen was first elected to the Legislative Yuan in 2012. Soon after taking office, he proposed that the legislature move to Dazhi, in Zhongshan District, Taipei. In 2014, he went to the funeral of Chin Hou-hsiu, President Ma Ying-jeou's mother, despite not receiving an invitation. He later apologized. The Democratic Progressive Party legislative caucus barred him from party activities within the legislature for six months. Additionally, he was referred to the legislature's discipline committee. Business magnate Terry Gou offered to fund a recall campaign against Chen.

The Democratic Progressive Party endorsed Chen for a second term in 2015, which he won. Chen contested a September 2016 internal election for secretary-general of the DPP caucus, losing to Liu Shih-fang. He was elected convener of the transportation committee in February 2017, alongside Cheng Pao-ching. By 2017, Chen was considered a potential candidate for the magistracy of Yilan County. However, after Lin Tsung-hsien and Wu Tze-cheng joined the Executive Yuan, the Democratic Progressive Party named Chen Chin-te acting county magistrate. Chen Chin-te declined to run in the 2018 local election, and Chen Ou-po registered for the party primary in January 2018. Hsieh Tsan-hui and Chiang Yung-ho also registered for the magisterial primary, but dropped out a week later. The Democratic Progressive Party formally nominated Chen Ou-po as its candidate for the Yilan County magistracy in March. Lin Tsung-hsien and Chen Chin-te, among others, aided Chen Ou-po's campaign. Following his loss to Lin Zi-miao, Chen remained a sitting legislator, and ran for reelection from Yilan County in the 2020 legislative elections. Chen Ou-po did not contest the Yilian County seat in the 2024 election cycle, and was succeeded by Chen Chun-yu.

== Electoral history ==
=== 2016 Yilan County legislative election ===
2016 Legislative election
	Elected			Runner-up		
Incumbent	Candidate	Party	Votes (%)	Candidate	Party	Votes (%)
DPP; Chen Ou-po	Chen Ou-po	DPP	53.68%	Li Zhiyong	Kuomintang	28.25%

=== 2018 Yilan County magistrate election ===
2018 Democratic Progressive Party Yilan County magistrate primary results
Candidates	Place	Result
Chen Ou-po	Nominated	Walkover

2018 Yilan County mayoral results
No.	Candidate	Party	Votes	Percentage
1	Lin Hsin-hua (林信華)	Independent	27,399	10.95%
2	Lin Zi-miao	Kuomintang	123,767	49.48%
3	Chen Ou-po	Democratic Progressive Party	95,609	38.23%
4	Lin Jin-kun (林錦坤)	Independent	1,922	0.77%
5	Chen Qiu-jing (陳秋境)	Independent	1,424	0.57%
Total voters			373,510	
Valid votes			250,121	
Invalid votes				
Voter turnout			66.97%	

== Political stances ==
Chen objected to the use of ractopamine in beef. To help track the addition of additives, he proposed bills mandating labels on meat products and has sought to strengthen food safety regulations at the local level.

Commenting on the workforce in 2012, Chen advocated for the government to raise unemployment benefits and employment subsidies. Additionally, he repeatedly drew attention to the rising costs of utilities. Chen opposed the implementation of supplementary national health insurance premiums in October 2012, stating that premiums should either be paid based on household income or the standard premiums should increase. During his first legislative term, Chen continually opposed the rising tolls charged for the use of freeways, remarking that the increases were especially harmful to his Yilan constituency. He continued to advocate for improvements to infrastructure serving Yilan throughout his second term, specifically proposing that traffic congestion in Hsuehshan Tunnel be investigated, and that a railway leading to Yilan parallel to the Chiang Wei-shui Memorial Freeway be built. Chen and Lee Kun-tse suggested in March 2017 that an agency be established to probe road incidents.

He supported the use of nuclear power conditionally, if first approved via referendum. However, in his view, the government remains unable to develop adequate disaster response procedures and waste treatment measures. In April 2014, he and Lin Yi-hsiung protested the scheduled activation of the Longmen Nuclear Power Plant by beginning a hunger strike, during which Chen passed out, necessitating medical treatment. Chen and Tien Chiu-chin attended the National Energy Conference in January 2015 and led a group of 200 protestors. Later that year, Chen suggested that Taiwan's nuclear waste be stored in the United States. In August 2017, Chen stated that Taiwan should invest more in geothermal energy, three years after hosting a public hearing on the topic.

Regarding Cross-Strait relations, Chen denounced one country, two systems shortly after taking office. He also called attention to China's economic influence on Taiwanese media. In December 2012, Chen criticized Ma Ying-jeou for allowing more Chinese agricultural imports. The next year, Chen chastised several government officials for their inaction as China announced a new air defense identification zone without notifying Taipei.

Chen supported negotiations with Japan in the Senkaku Islands dispute to maintain Taiwanese fishing rights in the area.

Chen said in September 2013, "It's up to the people of Taiwan to save this country. We should stand up with our determined voice to let the world know that Taiwan belongs in the UN."

== Bribery investigation ==
In June 2024, Chen was questioned by the Taipei District Prosecutors' Office in an investigation on bribery related to United Logistics International Company. In 2018, equipment owned by United Logistics International was lost in a collision of a cargo ship into the Port of Keelung. The company then sought assistance from Chen, and his actions are alleged to be violations of the Anti-Corruption Act. On 28 August 2025, Chen was indicted on charges of corruption and embezzlement. He was released on bail in November 2025. In April 2026, the Taipei District Court sentenced Chen to sixteen years imprisonment, and further deprived him of civil rights for six years.

== Personal life ==
Chen is married to Hsu Hui-yu.
