= Kao Fu-yao =

Taiwanese politician

- 高福堯

Deputy Minister of Public Construction Commission of the Republic of China
- Incumbent
- Assumed office 20 May 2016
- Minister: Wu Hong-mo
- Deputy: Yan Jeou-rong
- Succeeded by: Teng Min-chih

Personal details
- Education: National Chung Hsing University (LLB)

Kao Fu-yao (Chinese: 高福堯; pinyin: Gāo Fúyáo) is a Taiwanese lawyer. He has been the Deputy Minister of the Public Construction Commission since 20 May 2016.

== Education ==
Kao obtained his bachelor's degree in law from National Chung Hsing University.
