= National Kaohsiung First University of Science and Technology =

University in Kaohsiung, Taiwan

Coordinates: 22°45′16″N 120°20′0″E

- 國立高雄第一科技大學
- Motto: 敬業、樂群、卓越、創新
- Motto in English: Dedication, camaraderie, excellence, and innovation
- Type: Public
- Active: 1 July 1995–31 January 2018
- President: Roger C. Y. Chen
- Academic staff: 269
- Students: 7,804
- Undergraduates: 5,811
- Postgraduates: 1,993
- Location: Nanzih and Yanchao, Kaohsiung, Taiwan
- Campus: Urban 75 hectares (0.75 km^{2})
- Website: www.nkfust.edu.tw

National Kaohsiung First University of Science and Technology
- Traditional Chinese: 國立高雄第一科技大學
Transcriptions
Standard Mandarin
- Hanyu Pinyin: Guólì Gaōxióng Kējì Dàxué
- Tongyong Pinyin: Gúolì Gaosyóng Kējì Dàsyúe

National Kaohsiung First University of Science and Technology (NKFUST; Chinese: 國立高雄第一科技大學) was a national university in Nanzih District, Kaohsiung, Taiwan. It was colloquially known as Gaokeda (高科大, Pinyin Gaōkēdà) or Gaoxiongkeda (高雄科大, Pinyin Gaōxióngkēdà). Its campus is on 750,000 m^{2}. In 2018, NKFUST merged with National Kaohsiung University of Applied Sciences (KUAS) and National Kaohsiung Marine University (NKMU) to form National Kaohsiung University of Science and Technology (NKUST).

The university consisted of the colleges of Engineering, Electrical Engineering and Computer Science, Management, Finance and Banking and Foreign Languages with 15 departments and 27 graduate institutes. It housed approximately 269 teachers and enrolled about 7,804 students.

== History ==
NKFUST, formerly known as National Institute of Technology at Kaohsiung (often abbreviated NITK), was established on July 1, 1995 by the Ministry of Education (Republic of China) to educate students to develop Taiwan into an Asia-Pacific Regional Operations Center (APROC).

The Ministry of Education approved the upgrade of its status to university on July 1, 1998 and it was renamed National Kaohsiung First University of Science and Technology, the first higher education institution of technical and vocational education system in Kaohsiung.

== University presidents ==
Kaohsiung Tech

=== National Institute of Technology at Kaohsiung ===
- Chia-hung Ku: July 1995–July 1998

=== National Kaohsiung First University of Science and Technology ===
- Chia-hung Ku: July 1998–July 2004
- I-chang Jou: August 2004–July 2009
- Jyh-Horng Chou: August 2009–February 2010
- Meng-Hsiang Hsu: March 2010–April 2010
- Roger C. Y. Chen: May 2010–February 2018

== History ==
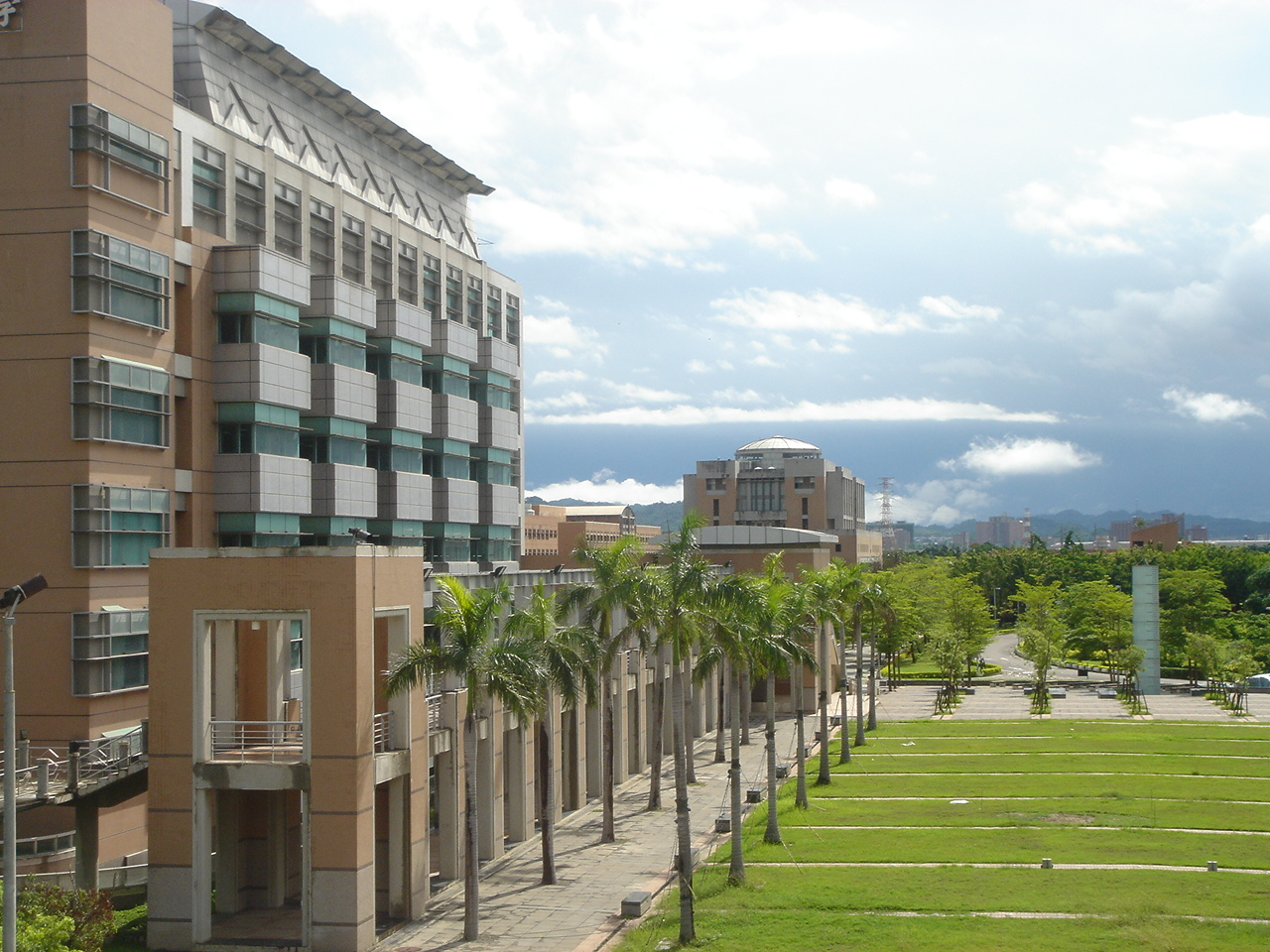
East campus (Library), NKFUST

National Institute of Technology at Kaohsiung (often abbreviated NITK) was established on July 1, 1995 by the Ministry of Education (Republic of China). Dr. Chia-hung Ku was the first president.

In July 1998, the NITK received the approval from the Ministry of Education to rename as National Kaohsiung First University of Science and Technology (NKFUST) as the first higher education institution of technical and vocational education system in the Kaohsiung area.

== Campus ==
NKFUST has a 75-hectare area in Kaohsiung City in southern Taiwan. The university is divided by National Highway No. 1 into the East and West campuses.

The East campus is mainly for teaching activities and the West campus for student residence and recreation. The campuses cover 750,000 square meters, with 191,533 square meters of building area.

The library has a collection of 284,921 items including books, audiovisual material and journals. There are 7,768 subscribing papers and electronic journals and 200 databases.

== Academics ==
College of Finance and Banking

- College of Engineering
  - Ph.D. Program, Institute of Engineering Science and Technology
  - Institute of Systems and Control Engineering
  - Department of Construction Engineering
  - Department of Safety, Health and Environmental Engineering
  - Department of Mechanical and Automation Engineering, Institute of Industrial Design
- College of Management
  - Ph.D. Program, Institute of Management
  - Institute of Business Management
  - International Master of Business Administration (IMBA)
  - Institute of Law in Science and Technology
  - Department of Logistics Management
  - Department of Information Management, Institute of Electronic Business
  - Department of Marketing and Distribution Management, Institute of Service Science and Management
- College of Electrical Engineering and Computer Science
  - Institute of Electro-Optical Engineering
  - Undergraduate Honors Program of Engineering
  - Department of Computer and Communication Engineering
  - Department of Electronic Engineering
- College of Finance and Banking
  - Ph.D. Program, Institute of Finance and Banking
  - Department of Money and Banking, Institute of Financial Planning
  - Department of Risk Management and Insurance
  - Department of Finance
  - Department of Accounting and Information Systems
- College of Foreign Languages
  - Department of English, Institute of Interpreting and Translation
  - Department of Japanese Language
  - Department of German Language

== Language Center ==
The objectives of the Language Center provides a modernized, multifunctional and individualized environment for language learning.

=== Chinese Language Program ===
Christmas tree and night view

The Language Center offers a non-credited Chinese language program for students wishing to improve their Chinese. The course emphasizes pronunciation, communication skills for daily situations, and simple writing.

=== Foreign Language Program ===
The Language Center provides courses for many foreign languages, such as Japanese, German, French, Spanish, and Korean.

== Sports, clubs, and student traditions ==
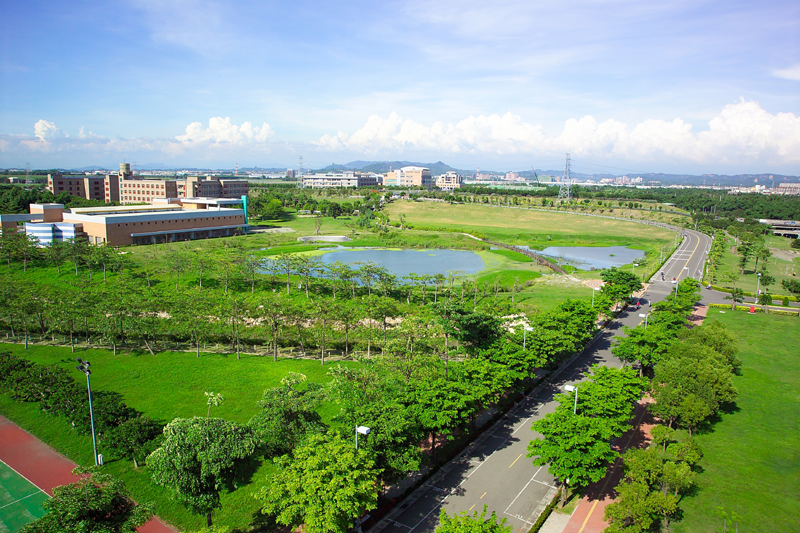
Ecological lake and swimming pool

The university fosters students' ability to think independently and to lead and work in teams. It encourages students to set up clubs according to their interests. There are 65 clubs which fall into seven categories: academic learning; music and drama; friendship; service; entertainment; sports; and others.

The university promotes sports in hope of fostering students’ lifelong interest and to promote students' mental and physical fitness. Every year, there are campus-wide sports activities such as cheering competition, jogging on campus, and anniversary sport competitions.

== Notable alumni ==
- Hung Tzu-yung, member of Legislative Yuan
- Pong Cheng-sheng, Deputy Mayor of Taipei
- Wu Hong-mo, Minister of Public Construction Commission

== Sister universities ==
United States of America	(United States) The George Washington University
United States of America	(United States) Iowa State University
United States of America	(United States) University of Florida
United States of America	(United States) University of Hawaii at Manoa
United States of America	(United States) Brigham Young University
United States of America	(United States) University of Wisconsin–La Crosse
Britain	(United Kingdom) University of Portsmouth
Russia	(Russia) Saratov State Technical University
Russia	(Russia) Novosibirsk State University of Architecture And Civil Engineering
Austria	(Austria) FH Joanneum
Australia	(Australia) Australian Maritime College
Australia	University of New England, Australia
Germany	(Germany) University of Bonn
Germany	(Germany) University of Applied Sciences Deggendorf
Canada	(Canada) University of Manitoba
Japan	(Japan) Waseda University
Japan	(Japan) Ritsumeikan University
Japan	(Japan) Osaka Prefecture University
Japan	(Japan) Baiko Gakuin University
Japan	(Japan) Heisei International University
Japan	(Japan) Himeji Dokkyo University
Japan	(Japan) University of Marketing and Distribution Sciences
Japan	(Japan) Sapporo International University
Malaysia	(Malaysia) Universiti Tunku Abdul Rahman
Thailand	(Thailand) King Mongkut's University of Technology Thonburi
Vietnam	(Vietnam) Hanoi University of Technology
Vietnam	Vietnam National University, Hanoi
Vietnam	(Vietnam) National Economics University
Vietnam	(Vietnam) Hanoi University of Civil Engineering
Vietnam	(Vietnam) Lac Hong University
Vietnam	(Vietnam) University of Technical Education HCMC
Vietnam	(Vietnam) Thai Nguyen University of Technology
People's Republic of China	(China) Jinan University
People's Republic of China	(China) Guangdong University of Technology
People's Republic of China	(China) Kunming University of Science and Technology

== See also ==
- List of universities in Taiwan
