= List of county magistrates of Yilan =

The magistrate of Yilan County is the chief executive of the government of Yilan County. This list includes directly elected magistrates of the county. The incumbent Magistrate is Lin Zi-miao of Kuomintang since 25 December 2018.

== Directly elected County Magistrates ==
Kuomintang Independent Democratic Progressive Party

№	Portrait	Name (Birth–Death)	Term of Office		Term	Political Party
1		Lu Tzuan-hsiang 盧纘祥; Lú Zuǎnxiáng (1903-1957)	1 June 1951	2 June 1954	1	Kuomintang
2		Kan Ah-yen 甘阿炎; Gān Āyán (1895-1974)	2 June 1954	2 June 1957	2	Kuomintang
2		Kan Ah-yen 甘阿炎; Gān Āyán (1895-1974)	2 June 1957	15 June 1958	3	Kuomintang
—		Wang Yueh-chiao 汪岳喬; Wāng Yuèqiáo	16 June 1958	2 June 1960	3	Kuomintang
3		Lin Tsai-tien 林才添; Lín Cáitiān (1903-1989)	2 June 1960	2 June 1964	4	Kuomintang
4		Chen Chin-tung 陳進東; Chén Jìndōng (1907-1988)	2 June 1964	2 June 1968	5	Kuomintang
4		Chen Chin-tung 陳進東; Chén Jìndōng (1907-1988)	2 June 1968	1 February 1973	6	Kuomintang
5		Lee Feng-ming 李鳳鳴; Lǐ Fèngmíng (1930-)	1 February 1973	20 December 1977	7	Kuomintang
5		Lee Feng-ming 李鳳鳴; Lǐ Fèngmíng (1930-)	20 December 1977	20 December 1981	8	Kuomintang
6		Chen Ding-nan 陳定南; Chén Dìngnán (1943-2006)	20 December 1981	30 May 1985	9	Independent
6		Chen Ding-nan 陳定南; Chén Dìngnán (1943-2006)	20 December 1985	20 December 1989	10	Independent
7		Yu Shyi-kun 游錫堃; Yóu Xíkūn (1948-)	20 December 1989	20 December 1993	11	Democratic Progressive Party
7		Yu Shyi-kun 游錫堃; Yóu Xíkūn (1948-)	20 December 1993	20 December 1997	12	Democratic Progressive Party
8		Liu Shou-cheng 劉守成; Liú Shǒuchéng (1951-)	20 December 1997	20 December 2001	13	Democratic Progressive Party
8		Liu Shou-cheng 劉守成; Liú Shǒuchéng (1951-)	20 December 2001	20 December 2005	14	Democratic Progressive Party
9		Lu Kuo-hua 呂國華; Lǚ Guóhuá (1956-)	20 December 2005	20 December 2009	15	Kuomintang
10		Lin Tsong-shyan 林聰賢; Lín Cōngxián (1962-)	20 December 2009	25 December 2014	16	Democratic Progressive Party
10		Lin Tsong-shyan 林聰賢; Lín Cōngxián (1962-)	25 December 2014	7 February 2017	17	Democratic Progressive Party
—		Wu Tze-cheng 吳澤成; Wú Zéchéng (1945-)	8 February 2017	6 November 2017	17	Independent
—		Chen Chin-te 陳金德; Chén Jindé (1961-)	6 November 2017	25 December 2018	17	Democratic Progressive Party
11		Lin Zi-miao 林姿妙; Lín Zīmiào (1952-)	25 December 2018	25 December 2022	18	Kuomintang
11		Lin Zi-miao 林姿妙; Lín Zīmiào (1952-)	25 December 2022	31 December 2024	19	Kuomintang
—		Lin Mao-sheng 林茂盛; Lín Màoshèng (1967-)	31 December 2024	Incumbent	19	Independent

== See also ==
- Yilan County Government
