= Chung Hsing Cultural and Creative Park =

Former factory in Wujie, Yilan County, Taiwan

- 中興文化創意園區
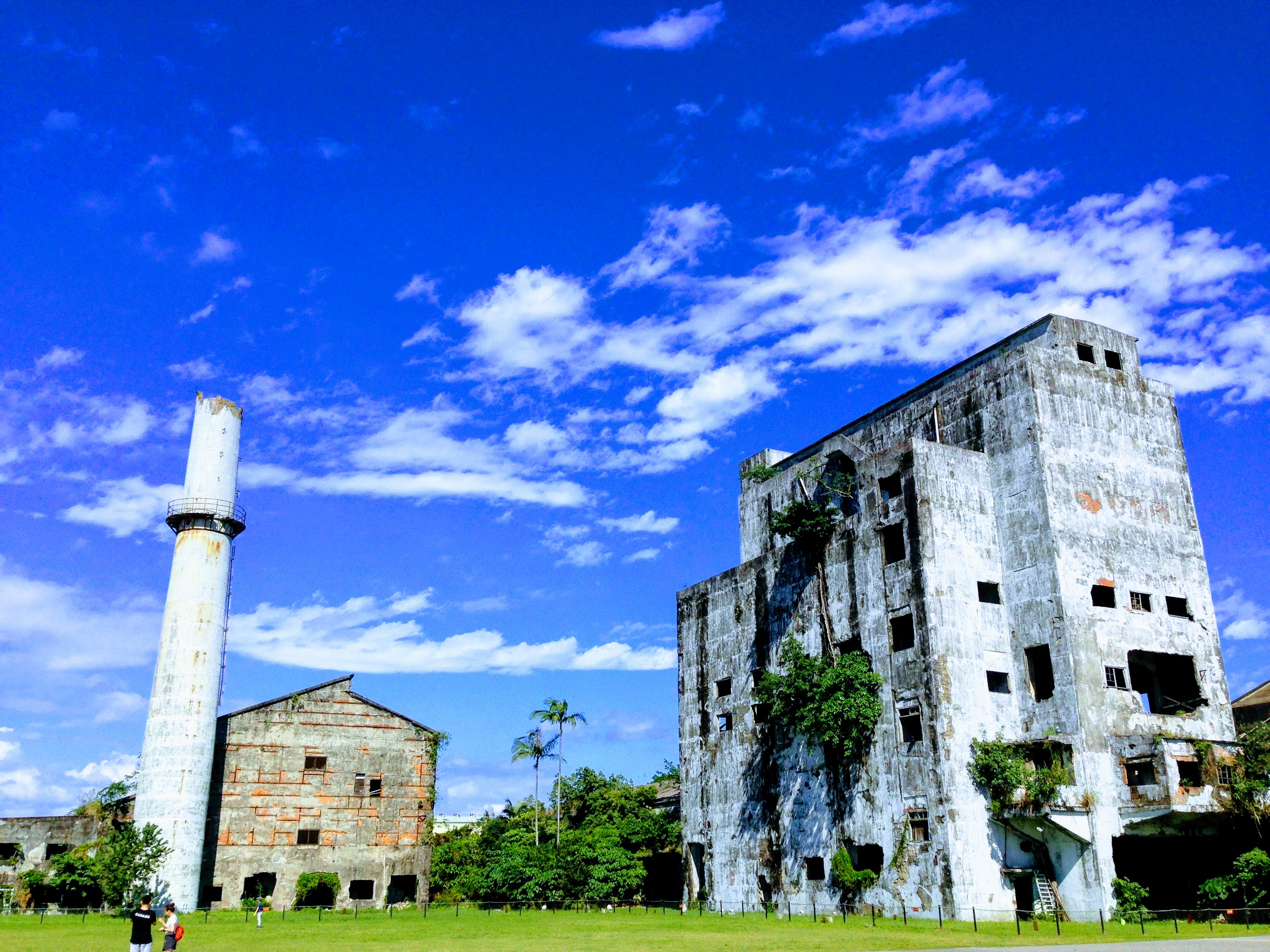
- Interactive map of Chung Hsing Cultural and Creative Park
- Former names: Taiwan Chung Hsing Paper Corporation
- Location: Wujie, Yilan County, Taiwan
- Coordinates: 24°41′39.5″N 121°46′11.2″E
- Owner: Yilan County Government
- Type: Former paper mill
- Public transit: Zhongli Station

Construction
- Built: 1935
- Closed: 2001

Website
- Official website

The Chung Hsing Cultural and Creative Park (traditional Chinese: 中興文化創意園區; simplified Chinese: 中兴文化创意园区; pinyin: Zhōngxìng Wénhuà Chuàngyì Yuánqū) is a multi-purpose park in Wujie Township, Yilan County, Taiwan.

== History ==
The building was originally constructed in 1935 as a paper manufacturing company. They produced papers using silvergrass and sugarcane waste pulping technology. In 1959, the company became a state-owned enterprise and was renamed Taiwan Chung Hsing Paper Corporation. They modernized their paper manufacturing process by using chemical processes. Their main products were newsprint, banknotes, lottery paper, toilet paper and wood-free paper. In 2001, the factory ceased operations and was taken over by Yilan County Government in 2014. It was then transformed into Chung Hsing Cultural and Creative Park.

== Activities ==
The park regularly hosts various exhibitions, stage performances and group tours of the old factory buildings.

== Transportation ==
The park is accessible within walking distance west from Zhongli Station of Taiwan Railway.

== Gallery ==
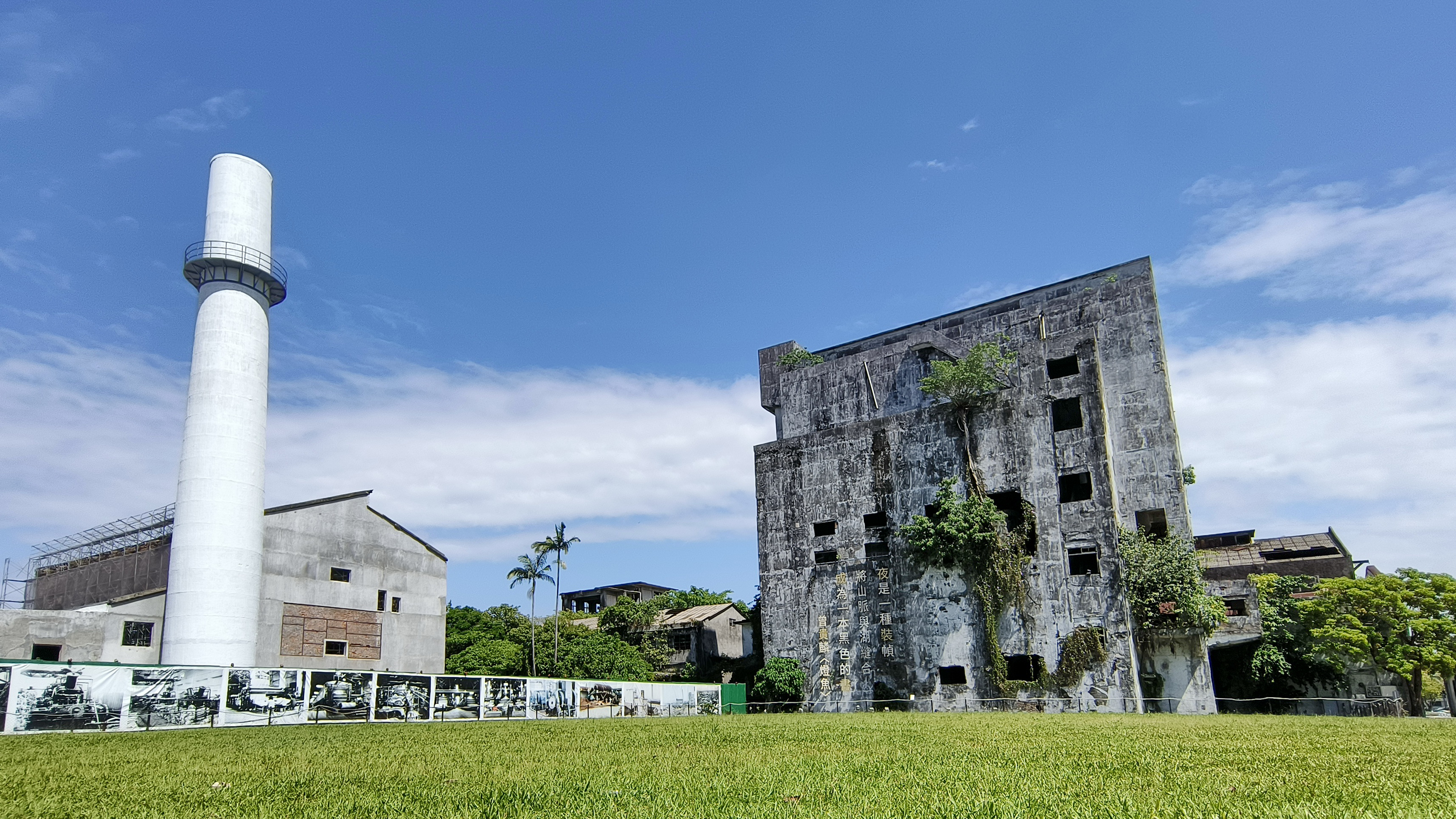

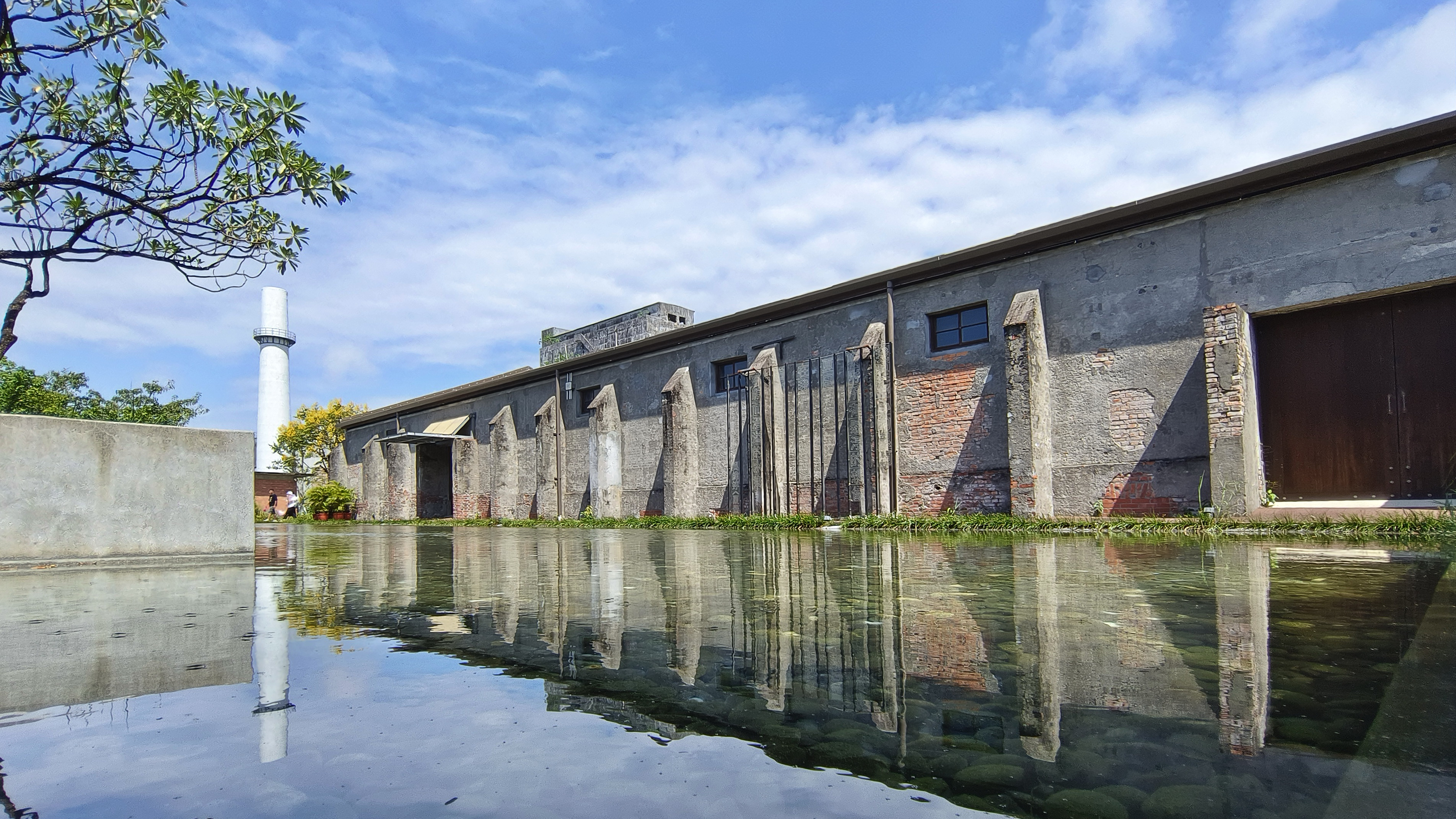

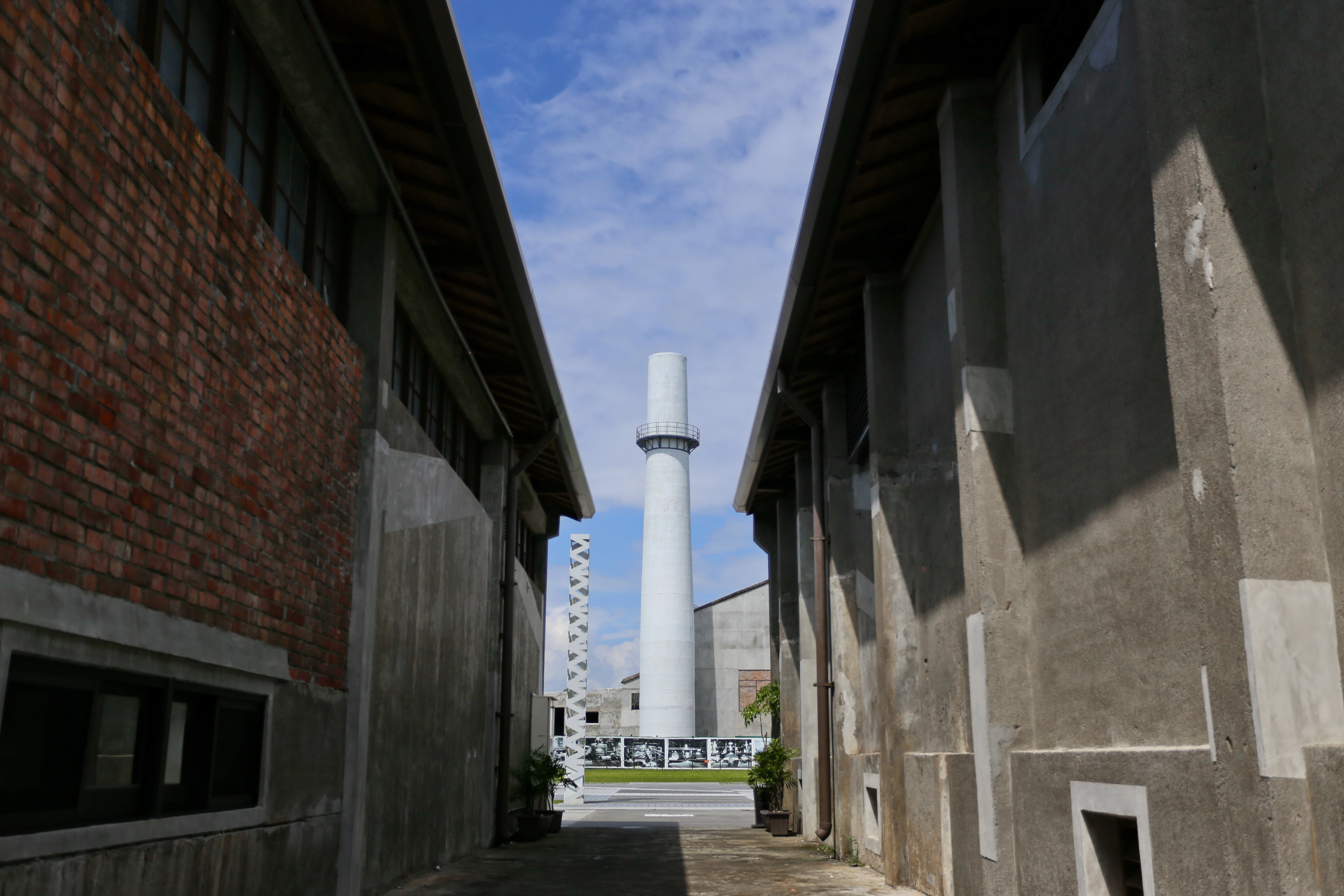

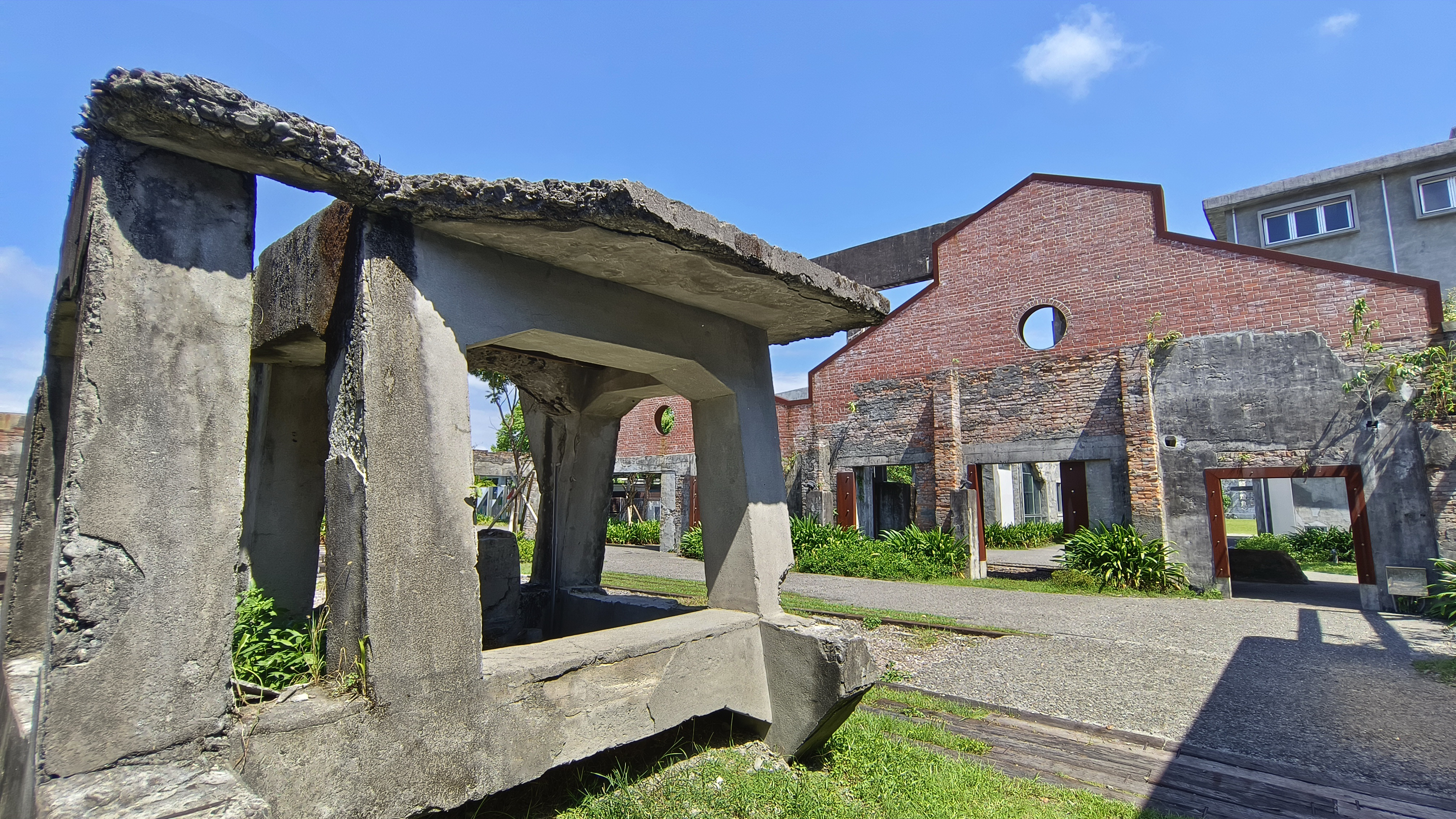

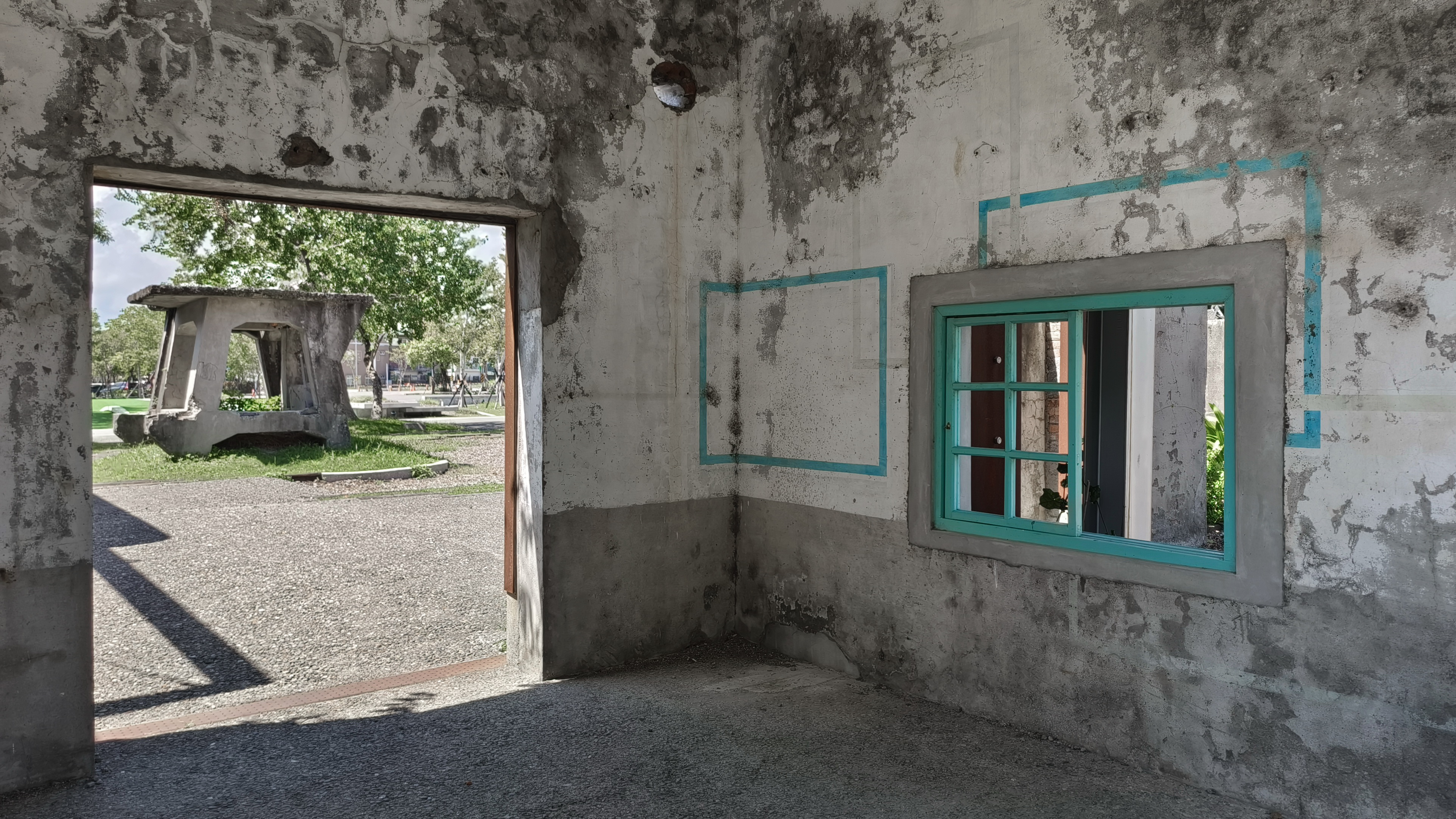

== See also ==
- List of tourist attractions in Taiwan
