= Chen Chun-yu =

Taiwanese politician (born 1975)

Chen Chun-yu MLY
- 陳俊宇
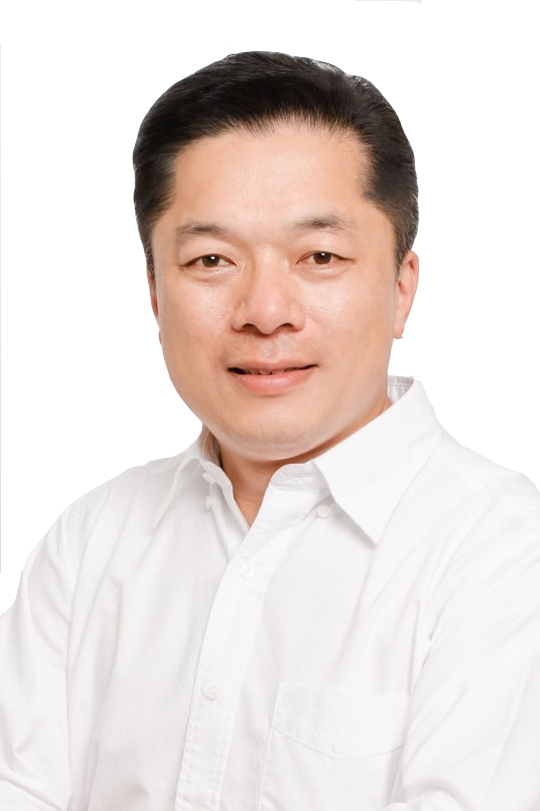
- Chen in 2024

Member of the Legislative Yuan
- Incumbent
- Assumed office 1 February 2024
- Preceded by: Chen Ou-po
- Constituency: Yilan County

Member of the Yilan County Council
- In office 25 December 2014 – 31 January 2024

Yuanshan Township Councilor
- In office 1 August 2010 – 24 December 2014

Personal details
- Born: 14 March 1975 (age 51) Yuanshan, Yilan, Taiwan
- Party: Democratic Progressive Party
- Education: Lan Yang Institute of Technology (BS); Fo Guang University (MPA)

Chen Chun-yu (Chinese: 陳俊宇; born 14 March 1975) is a Taiwanese politician.

== Early life and education ==
Chen was born on 14 March 1975 in Yilan County, Taiwan. He was raised in a farming family in Yuanshan Township, where his family cultivated starfruit and ponkan mandarins. His father was a founding member of the Democratic Progressive Party (DPP) and was active in supporting opposition politicians. Chen's uncle, Chen Ou-po, also became a politician and served as a member of the Legislative Yuan.

Chen was exposed to the Tangwai movement during his childhood through his father's political activities. He attended Da Hu Elementary School (大湖國小), then Fuxing Junior High School (復興國中) in Yilan County. He finished his secondary education at National Yilan Commercial Vocational Senior High School, where he studied data processing.

After high school, Chen graduated from the Lan Yang Institute of Technology with a Bachelor of Arts in international trade. He later a master's degree in public affairs from Fo Guang University.

== Political career ==
Chen served a single term on the Yuanshan Township Council. While a member of the Yilan County Council, Chen led the council's Democratic Progressive Party caucus. He has also led Yilan County's Democratic Progressive Party chapter. In July 2023, the DPP nominated Chen to run in the Legislative Yuan's Yilan County Constituency, and he faced Joy Huang of the Kuomintang and Taiwan People's Party candidate Chen Wan-hui in the 2024 legislative election. As a legislator, he has raised questions about the policy implementation procedures of the Ministry of the Interior, as well as the workload of the Taiwanese judiciary.
