= Lin Zi-miao =

Taiwanese politician (born 1952)

- 林姿妙
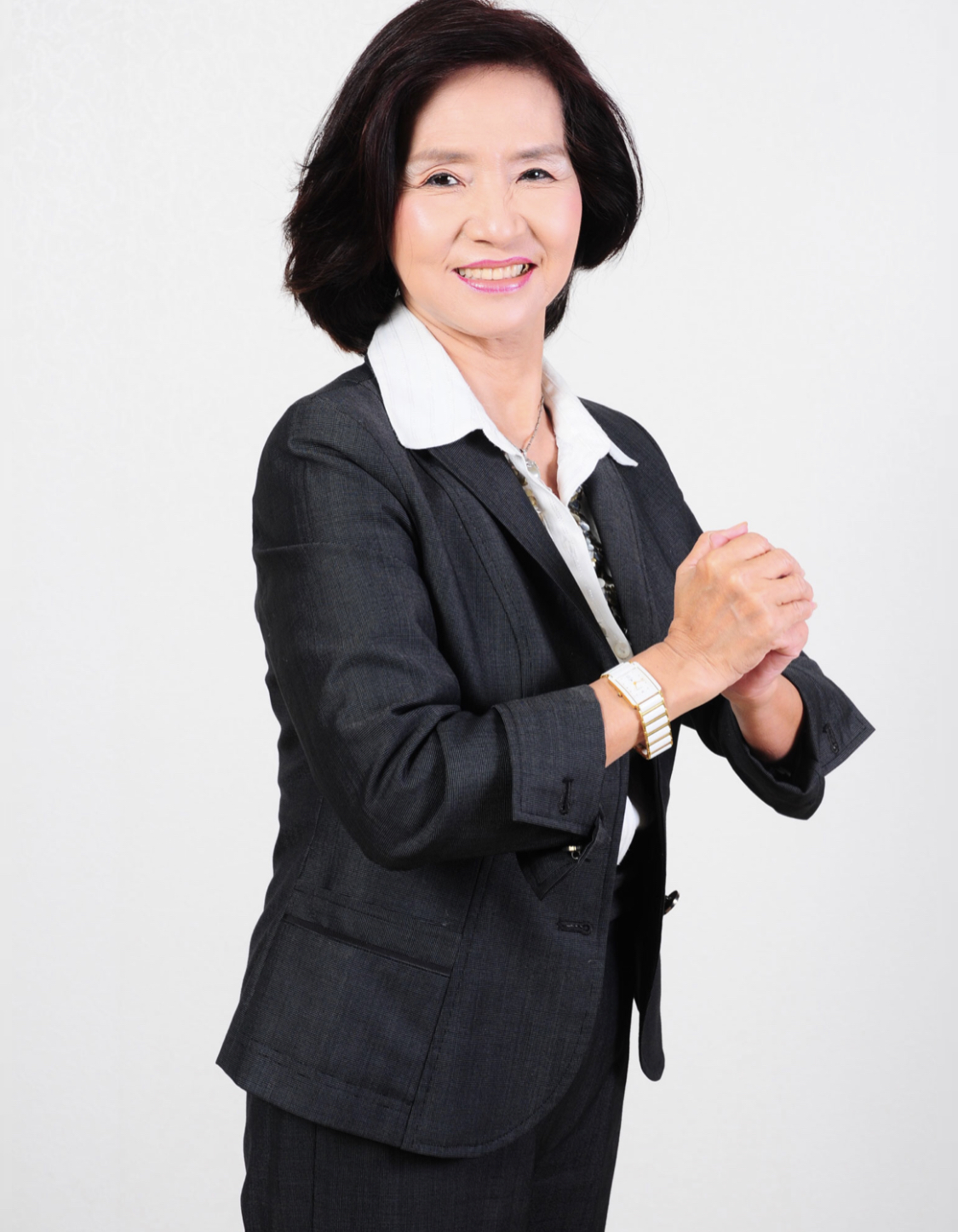
- Official portrait, 2010

11th Magistrate of Yilan
- In office 25 December 2018 – 31 December 2024
- Deputy: See list: Lin Chien-jung Lin Mao-sheng
- Preceded by: Chen Chin-te (acting)
- Succeeded by: Lin Mao-sheng (acting)

11th Mayor of Luodong
- In office 1 March 2010 – 25 December 2018
- Preceded by: Lin Tsung-hsien; Lai Hsi-lu (acting)
- Succeeded by: Wu Chiu-lin

Yilan County Councillor
- In office 1 Match 1998 – 28 February 2010
- Constituency: Yilan County VI

Personal details
- Born: 28 January 1952 (age 74) Luodong, Yilan, Taiwan
- Party: Kuomintang
- Education: Lan Yang Institute of Technology (BS); Fo Guang University (MA)

Lin Zi-miao (Chinese: 林姿妙; pinyin: Lín Zīmiào; born 28 January 1952) is a Taiwanese politician. A member of the Kuomintang, she served as the magistrate of Yilan County from 2018 to 2024.

== Education ==
After being educated at National Lotung Commercial Vocational High School, Lin graduated from Lan Yang Institute of Technology and then earned a master's degree in public affairs from Fo Guang University.

== Political career ==
Lin was mayor of her home township Luodong until 2018.

=== 2018 Yilan County magistrate election ===
She began campaigning for the Yilan County Magistracy in early 2018, and won stronger local support compared to her opponent, Chen Ou-po.

2018 Kuomintang Yilan County magistrate primary results
Candidates	Place	Result
Lin Zi-miao	Called In	Walkover

Lin defeated Chen in local elections held on 24 November 2018.

2018 Yilan County mayoral results
No.	Candidate	Party	Votes	Percentage
1	Lin Hsin-hua (林信華)	Independent	27,399	10.95%
2	Lin Zi-miao	Kuomintang	123,767	49.48%
3	Chen Ou-po	Democratic Progressive Party	95,609	38.23%
4	Lin Jin-kun (林錦坤)	Independent	1,922	0.77%
5	Chen Qiu-jing (陳秋境)	Independent	1,424	0.57%
Total voters			373,510	
Valid votes			250,121	
Invalid votes				
Voter turnout			66.97%	

== Corruption charges ==
On 13 January 2022, Lin was one of several Yilan government officials questioned during an investigation into suspected corruption. Prosecutors clarified the next day that several cases were being investigated, and that Lin had been released without bail after the questioning concluded.

A second round of questioning took place on 22 February 2022, focusing on value-added tax exemptions for a Luodong Township property granted in 2019, and subsequent revisions to the township's urban development plans. Investigators later stated that they had tracked nearly NT$100 million in transfers, dating to the early 2000s, to Lin and her relatives from Yang Chi-hsiung.

In August 2022, the Yilan County Prosecutors' Office charged Lin, her daughter, and several others with corruption. According to the indictment, Lin violated charges of money laundering and anti-corruption laws, including creating a false appearance of conducting loans. Prosecutors sought a 20-year prison sentence for the alleged breach of the Anti-Corruption Act.

On 31 December 2024, Lin was sentenced by the Yilan District Court to 12.5 years in prison on corruption charges. The court also ordered the seizure of NT$32.5 million from Lin. She was suspended as Yilan County magistrate, with her deputy magistrate filling the position. In February 2025, the Yilan District Prosecutors Office appealed for a retrial of Lin's case.
