= Teng Min-chih =

Taiwanese politician

- 鄧民治

Deputy Minister of Public Construction Commission of the Republic of China
- Minister: Chern Jenn-chuan; Yan Jeou-rong (acting); Chen Shi-shuenn; Hsu Chun-yat
- Deputy: Yan Jeou-rong
- Succeeded by: Kao Fu-yao

Personal details
- Education: National Chung Hsing University (LLB); Chinese Culture University (LLM)

Teng Min-chih (Chinese: 鄧民治; pinyin: Dèng Mínzhì) is a Taiwanese lawyer and politician. He was the Deputy Minister of the Public Construction Commission of the Executive Yuan until 20 May 2016.

== Education ==
Teng received his bachelor's and master's degrees in law from National Chung Hsing University and Chinese Culture University, respectively.

== Early career ==
He worked as clerk and specialist in the Ministry of Civil Service of the Examination Yuan; specialist, secretary-general of central district office, secretary, secretary-general and deputy director of Department of Rapid Transit Systems of Taipei City Government; and secretary-general of Taipei City Government.
