= Hsu Chun-yat =

Taiwanese politician

- 許俊逸

Minister of Public Construction Commission of the Republic of China
- In office 1 July 2014 – 20 May 2016
- Deputy: Yan Jeou-rong, Teng Min-chih
- Preceded by: Chen Shi-shuenn
- Succeeded by: Wu Hong-mo

Minister without Portfolio of the Executive Yuan
- Incumbent
- Assumed office 1 July 2014

Administrative Deputy Minister of Transportation and Communications of the Republic of China
- In office August 2012 – July 2013
- Minister: Yeh Kuang-shih
- Succeeded by: Fan Chih-ku

Personal details
- Education: National Cheng Kung University (BS); Asian Institute of Technology (MS)

Hsu Chun-yat or Jack Hsu (Chinese: 許俊逸; pinyin: Xǔ Jùnyì) is a Taiwanese politician. He was the Minister of the Public Construction Commission from July 2014 until May 2016.

== Education ==
Hsu obtained his bachelor's degree in civil engineering from National Cheng Kung University and master's degree in transportation engineering from Asian Institute of Technology in Thailand.

== Political career ==
Prior to his appointment as deputy minister of the Ministry of Transportation and Communications, Hsu was the Director-General of the Railway Reconstruction Bureau of the MOTC on 21 July 2008 until August 2012.

== ROC Transportation and Communications Deputy Ministry ==
=== Taoyuan International Airport MRT delay ===
In May 2013, due to the continuing delay of Taoyuan International Airport MRT completion and the resignation of Chu Shu, former Bureau of High Speed Rail director-general, Hsu was assigned to oversee the operation of the bureau.

== See also ==
- Transportation in Taiwan
