= Wu Hong-mo =

Politician from Taiwan

- 吳宏謀
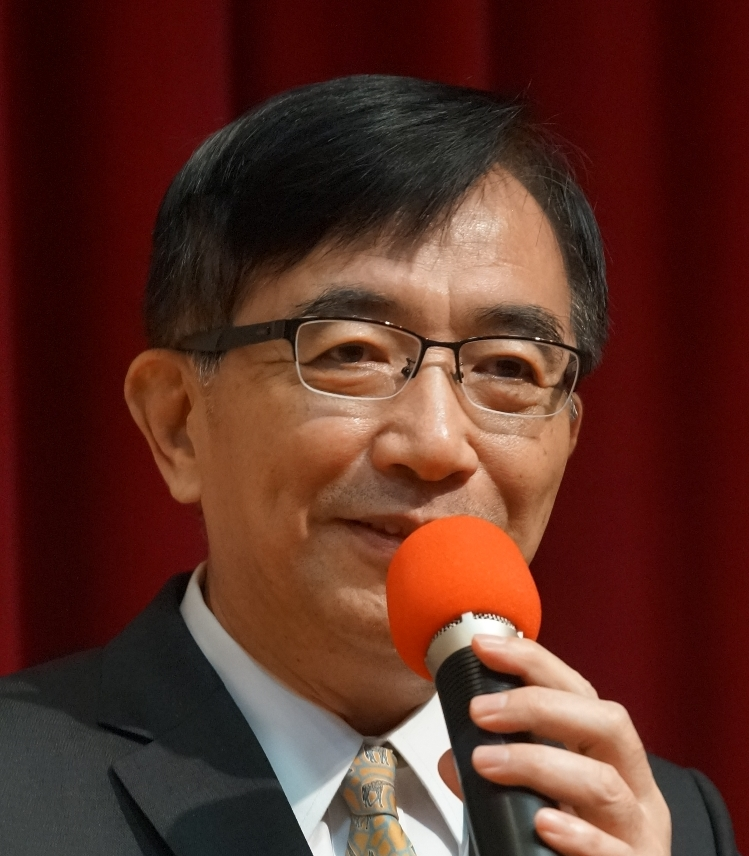
- Wu in 2016

Minister of Transportation and Communications
- In office 16 July 2018 – 1 December 2018
- Deputy: Chang Chen-yuan, Wang Kwo-tsai (political); Chi Wen-jong (administrative)
- Preceded by: Hochen Tan
- Succeeded by: Wang Kwo-tsai (acting); Lin Chia-lung

Minister of Public Construction Commission
- In office 20 May 2016 – 23 November 2017
- Deputy: Kao Fu-yao, Yan Jeou-rong
- Preceded by: Hsu Chun-yat
- Succeeded by: Wu Tze-cheng

Minister without Portfolio
- In office 20 May 2016 – 23 November 2017
- Premier: Lin Chuan

Personal details
- Born: 1955 (age 70–71) Shuilin, Yunlin County, Taiwan
- Education: Feng Chia University (BS); National Kaohsiung University of Science and Technology (MS); National Sun Yat-sen University (PhD)

Wu Hong-mo (Chinese: 吳宏謀; pinyin: Wú Hóngmóu; born 1955) is a Taiwanese politician and engineer currently serving as chairperson of Chunghwa Post, the official postal service of Taiwan. He previously served as a deputy mayor of Kaohsiung from 2014 to 2016, minister of the Public Construction Commission from 2016 to 2017, and minister of transportation and communications from July to December 2018.

Wu also served as chairperson of Taiwan International Ports Corporation from 2017 to 2018.

== Early life and education ==
Wu was born in Shuilin, Yunlin County. He graduated with a bachelor's degree in civil engineering from Feng Chia University in 1976 and earned a master's degree in environmental engineering from National Kaohsiung First University of Science and Technology in 2002. His master's thesis was titled, "A study of rainwater and sewage separation in an urban environment: The case of Kaohsiung" (Chinese: 雨污水分流對都市環境品質影響之研究－以高雄市為例).

In 2015, Wu earned his Ph.D. in environmental engineering from National Sun Yat-sen University (NSYSU). His doctoral dissertation was titled, "Integrated coastal planning and protection at Cijin, Kaohsiung" (Chinese: 海岸環境營造規劃案例研究-以高雄旗津海岸為例).

== Engineering career ==
Wu worked in the Kaohsiung Public Works Bureau prior to his political career. He was the director of Kaohsiung's Hydraulic Engineering Office during Frank Hsieh's mayoralty and worked on the city's "city-port overhaul merger" initiative (市港合一), including Sizihwan landscape engineering and stormwater management projects. Subsequently, he was promoted to director of the Public Works Bureau, and then secretary-general of the Kaohsiung City government.

== Political career ==
Wu is considered a political protégé of former Kaohsiung mayor Chen Chu, and served as a deputy mayor under Chen's mayoralty, from 1 April 2014 to 31 July 2014 then from 25 December 2014 to 19 May 2016.

Wu was appointed minister of the Public Construction Commission in April 2016. In February 2017, Wu requested the Kinmen Bridge completion date to be moved to the end of 2019. He was appointed Minister of Transportation and Communications in July 2018. Following the Puyuma Express derailment in 2018, Wu resigned from the position in December 2018.

Wu was appointed chairperson of Chunghwa Post, serving since 28 June 2019.

== Selected works ==
- Wu, Hong-mo (2015). Integrated Coastal Planning and Protection at Cijin, Kaohsiung (PhD thesis). National Sun Yat-sen University.
