= Arthur Chen (disambiguation) =

Arthur Chen (陈飞宇; born 2000) is a Chinese-American actor.

Arthur Chen may also refer to:

- Arthur Y. Chen (陳豫), Taiwanese politician, Minister of Public Construction Commission (1995–1996)
- Chen Yi-min (陳宜民; born 1956), Taiwanese politician and doctor, member of the 9th Legislative Yuan (2016–2020)

== See also ==
- Arthur Chin (陳瑞鈿; 1913–1997), Chinese-American pilot who served in the Republic of China Air Force during World War II
