= Chen Zhenchuan =

Chen Zhenchuan may refer to:

- Chern Jenn-chuan (陳振川), Republic of China politician
- Tan Chin Tuan (陈振传), Singaporean banker
