= Yan Jeou-rong =

Taiwanese politician

- 顏久榮

Minister of Public Construction
- Acting; 1 August 2013 – 21 October 2013
- Prime Minister: Jiang Yi-huah
- Deputy: Teng Min-chih
- Preceded by: Chern Jenn-chuan
- Succeeded by: Chen Shi-shuenn

Deputy Minister of Public Construction
- In office 22 October 2013 – 20 May 2024
- Minister: Chen Shi-shuenn; Hsu Chun-yat; Wu Hong-mo; Wu Tze-cheng
- In office July 2013 – 1 August 2013
- Minister: Chern Jenn-chuan

Personal details
- Education: Chung Yuan Christian University (BS); Asian Institute of Technology (MS)

Yan Jeou-rong (Chinese: 顏久榮; pinyin: Yán Jiǔróng) is a Taiwanese politician. He was the acting Minister of the Public Construction Commission of the Executive Yuan in August–October 2013.

== Education ==
Yan obtained his bachelor's degree in civil engineering from Chung Yuan Christian University and master's degree in structural engineering and construction from the Asian Institute of Technology in Thailand.
