= Chern Jenn-chuan =

Taiwanese civil engineer and academic

- 陳振川

Minister without Portfolio and Minister of Public Construction Commission of the Republic of China
- In office 6 February 2012 – 1 August 2013
- Deputy: Yan Jeou-rong; Teng Min-chih
- Preceded by: Lee Hong-yuan
- Succeeded by: Yan Jeou-rong (acting); Chen Shi-shuenn

Deputy Minister of Public Construction Commission of the Republic of China
- In office May 2008 – 5 February 2012
- Minister: Fan Liang-shiow; Lee Hong-yuan

Personal details
- Born: 28 July 1954 (age 71) Jinhu, Kinmen, Fujian
- Education: National Taiwan University (BS); Rice University (MS); Northwestern University (PhD)
- Scientific career
- Fields: Civil engineering
- Thesis: Creep Law of Concrete, Its Uncertainty and Effects of Drying and Cracking (1984)
- Doctoral advisor: Zdeněk P. Bažant

Chern Jenn-chuan (Chinese: 陳振川; pinyin: Chén Zhènchuān; born 28 July 1954) is a Taiwanese civil engineer and academic. He is a professor emeritus of civil engineering at National Taiwan University. He is the CEO of the Tang Prize Foundation, which is responsible for the planning and development of events associated with the Tang Prize. Previously, Chern served in multiple ministerial positions in the Executive Yuan.

== Education ==
Chern graduated from National Taiwan University with a Bachelor of Science (B.S.) in civil engineering. He then completed graduate studies in the United States, where he earned a Master of Science (M.S.) in civil engineering from Rice University and his Ph.D. in civil engineering from Northwestern University in 1984 under professor Zdeněk P. Bažant. His doctoral dissertation was titled, "Creep Law of Concrete, Its Uncertainty and Effects of Drying and Cracking."

== Awards, honors and activities ==
Chern is the recipient of many awards, including the Significant Contribution to 921 Chi-Chi Earthquake Reconstruction Award from the 921 Post-Disaster Recovery Commission of Cabinet: the 921 Earthquake New Campus Movement Contribution Award from the Ministry of Education.

In 2008, he received the International Contribution Award from the Japan Society of Civil Engineers (JSCE). Chern also received the ACECC Civil Engineering Achievement Award in 2010 for his lifetime devotion and contributions to the world. In 2015, he received the Engineering Medal, the highest honor, from the Chinese Institute of Engineers (Taiwan).

In addition, Chern plays an active role both locally and internationally on civil engineering and concrete societies. He is the past Chair of the Executive Committee of Asian Civil Engineering Coordinating Council (ACECC), past president of the International Society for Social Management Systems (SSMS), and the vice president of the Asian Concrete Federation (ACF). He was the past president of the Chinese Institute of Engineers (CIE), a leading engineering organization in Taiwan, and has served two terms as the president of the Chinese Institute of Civil and Hydraulic Engineering (CICHE) and is the founder and the first president of the Taiwan Concrete Institute (TCI). Chern is a fellow of American Concrete Institute (ACI), an vice-president and academician of the International Academy of Engineering (IAE) and foreign academician of the Russia Academy of Engineering (RAE). He is also a fellow and honorary member of CIE and CICHE, honorary member of Mongolian Association of Civil Engineers, honorary member both of Chinese Society of Structural Engineering (CSSE) and Asian Institute of Technology (AIT) Alumni Association in Taiwan.
