= Chen Chin-te =

Taiwanese politician

Chen Chin-te MLY
- 陳金德
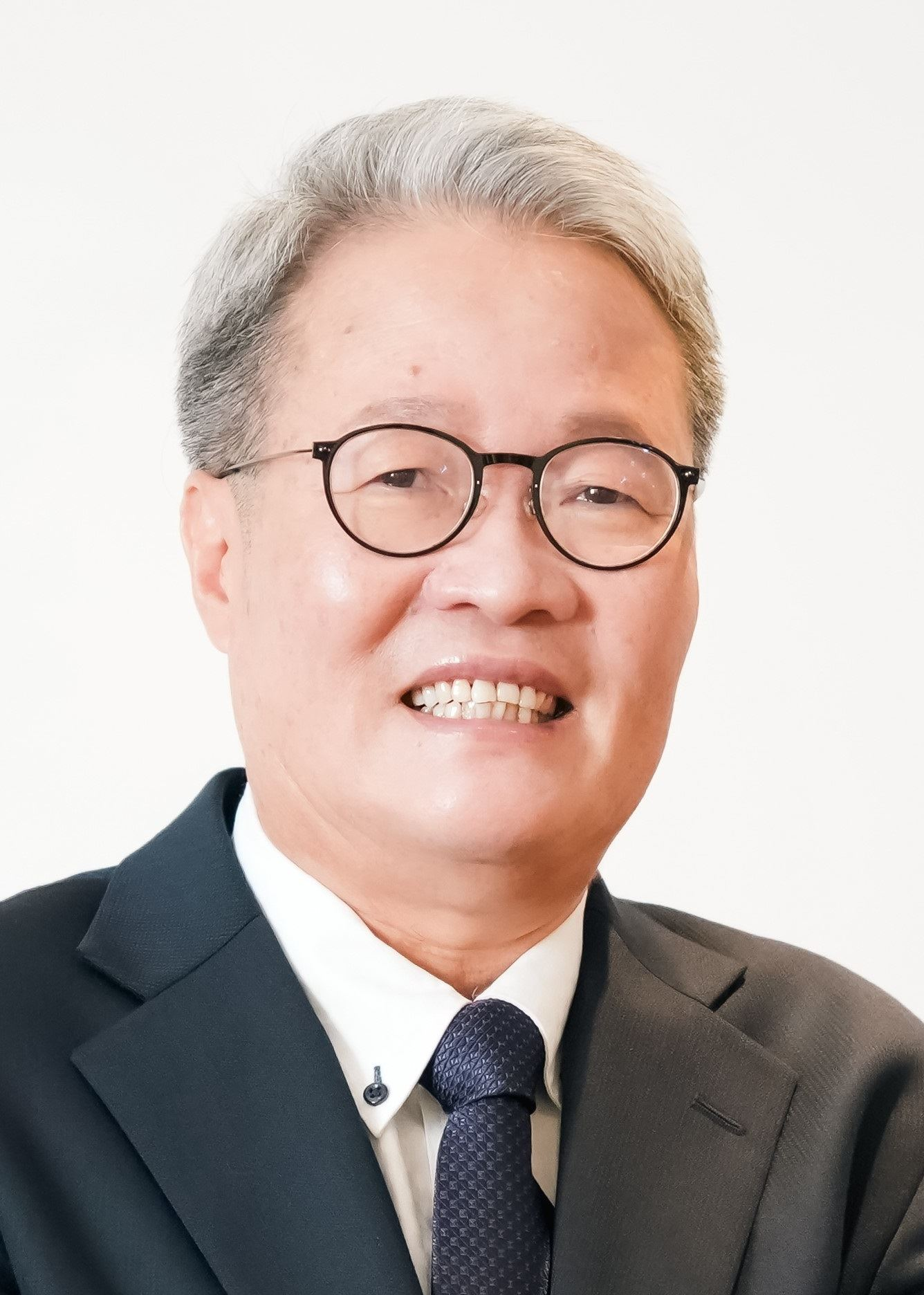
- Official portrait, 2024

14th Minister of Public Construction
- Incumbent
- Assumed office 20 May 2024
- Prime Minister: Cho Jung-tai
- Preceded by: Wu Tze-cheng

Minister without Portfolio
- Incumbent
- Assumed office 20 May 2024
- Prime Minister: Cho Jung-tai
- Preceded by: Wu Tze-cheng

Magistrate of Yilan
- Acting; 6 November 2017 – 25 December 2018
- Preceded by: Wu Tze-cheng (a.i.)
- Succeeded by: Lin Zi-miao
Additional offices
15th Chairman of the CPC Corporation
In office 12 September 2016 – 18 August 2017
Minister	Lee Chih-kung; Shen Jong-chin
Preceded by	Lin Sheng-chung
Succeeded by	Yang Wei-fuu (acting)
Deputy Mayor of Kaohsiung
In office 25 December 2014 – 11 September 2016
Mayor	Chen Chu
Succeeded by	Shih Che

Member of the Legislative Yuan
- In office 1 February 2002 – 31 January 2008
- Succeeded by: Lin Chien-jung
- Constituency: Yilan County

Personal details
- Born: 26 September 1961 (age 65) Luodong, Yilan, Taiwan
- Party: Democratic Progressive Party
- Education: National Taiwan University of Science and Technology (BS); National Taiwan University (MS, MBA)

Chen Chin-te (Chinese: 陳金德; born 26 September 1961), also known as Derek Chen, is a Taiwanese politician who has served as the minister of the Public Construction Commission since 2024.

== Education ==
Chen graduated from the National Taipei University of Technology with a Bachelor of Science in chemical engineering in 1986. He then attended National Taiwan University, where he earned an M.S. in chemical engineering and an M.B.A. in 1989 and 2004, respectively.

Through his student activism, Chen became known as the "oldest grandson of the tangwai movement." He worked as Yu Shyi-kun's secretary when Yu was Yilan County magistrate. Chen ended his graduate studies without earning a doctoral degree, to run in the 1991 National Assembly elections.

== Career ==
While a member of the National Assembly, Chen also served as Democratic Progressive Party caucus leader. Within the DPP, Chen was affiliated with the New Tide faction. In 2000, Chen helped pass laws that reduced the power of the legislative body. Most of the assembly's responsibilities were delegated to the Legislative Yuan.

Upon stepping down from the National Assembly, Chen served as leader of Yilan County's Civil Affairs Bureau. He formed an electoral coalition with Chen Tsiao-long, Chiu Kuo-chang, Kang Tai-shan, Liu Yi-te, and Lan Shih-tsung prior to the 2001 Legislative Yuan elections. The group vowed to bring reforms similar to those implemented in the National Assembly to the Legislative Yuan. Out of these six candidates, only the Chens were elected to the Legislative Yuan. Shortly after taking office as a representative of Yilan County, Chen Chin-te became the first DPP official to visit China since Chinese vice premier Qian Qichen explicitly acknowledged the possibility in 2002. Chen began discussing legislative reform upon his return from China. He supported a Legislative Yuan with approximately 140 members, and formed an inter-party alliance to discuss the issue in May 2002, alongside fellow lawmakers Alex Tsai and Lu Hsueh-chang. Chen criticized a vote held on legislative membership reductions in March 2004, as rushed. An amendment cutting the number of seats in the Legislative Yuan was passed later that year.

In addition to legislative reform, Chen also sought to codify the use of referendums. He proposed a bill for that purpose in 2003. Later that year, Chen was tasked with announcing the party platform regarding referendums. The Referendum Act was enacted in December 2003.

Chen was reelected to the Legislative Yuan in 2004, but lost his bid for a third term in 2008 to Lin Chien-jung. Near the end of Chen's term, he served as convenor of the Organic Laws and Statues Committee. Chen engaged in contentious discussions, occupying the speaker's podium in January 2007 to delay a budget vote, and telling Ting Shou-chung, "You are a lackey of China," while debating absentee voting in March 2007. In June, Chen initiated a vote of no confidence against Premier Chang Chun-hsiung, a fellow member of the Democratic Progressive Party, in an attempt to dissolve the Sixth Legislative Yuan, though the vote failed. After Yilan County Magistrate Lu Kuo-hua announced the end of the Children's Folklore and Folk Game Festival, Chen attempted to stage a recall vote against Lu.

Upon leaving the Legislative Yuan at the end of his second term, Chiu served Kaohsiung County Government as leader of the Environmental Protection Bureau. After Kaohsiung County and Kaohsiung City had merged to form a special municipality, Chen Chin-te served as deputy mayor of Kaohsiung under Chen Chu. Later, Chen Chin-te served as chairman of the CPC Corporation. He resigned the position on 18 August 2017 after a widespread blackout affected the nation three days prior. Chen succeeded Wu Tze-cheng as acting Yilan County magistrate on 6 November. In January 2018, Chen stated that he would not seek a full term as Yilan County magistrate.

On 16 April 2024, Chen was appointed leader of the Public Construction Commission, again succeeding Wu Tze-cheng.
