= Yilan Story Museum =

Museum in Yilan City, Yilan County, Taiwan

- 宜蘭人故事館
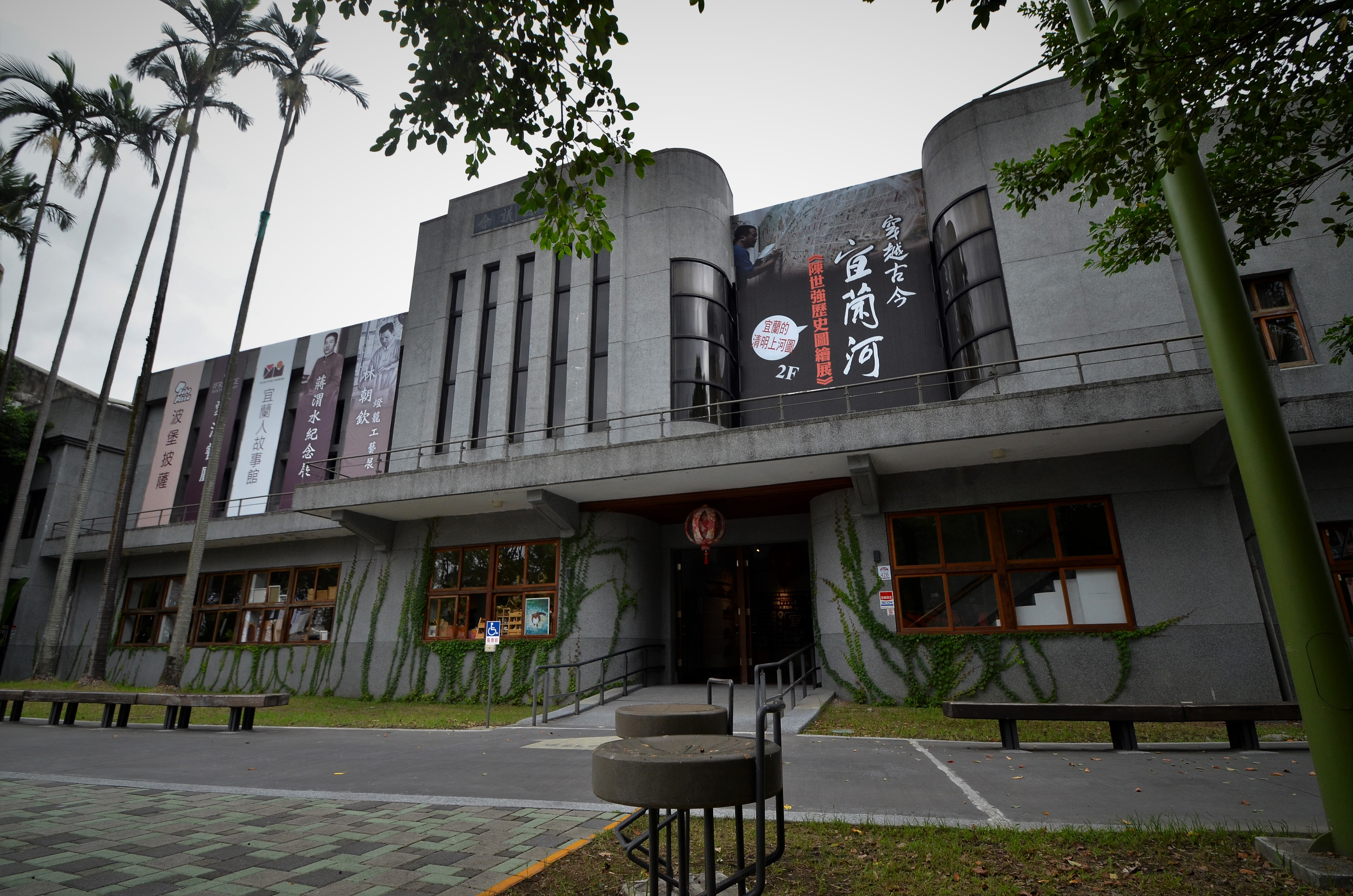
- Established: 2001
- Location: Yilan City, Yilan County, Taiwan
- Coordinates: 24°45′05.5″N 121°45′13.1″E
- Type: museum
- Website: Official website (in Chinese)

The Yilan Story Museum (traditional Chinese: 宜蘭人故事館; simplified Chinese: 宜兰人故事馆; pinyin: Yílánrén Gùshì Guǎn) is a museum in Yilan City, Yilan County, Taiwan.

== History ==
The museum building was originally constructed in 1959 to house the Yilan County Council. In 2001, the council moved out and the Yilan Story Museum was established in the building.

== Transportation ==
The museum is accessible within walking distance southwest from Yilan Station of Taiwan Railway.

== See also ==
- List of museums in Taiwan
