= Lin Neng-pai =

Taiwanese politician

- 林能白

Minister of Public Construction Commission of the Republic of China
- In office 20 May 2000 – 1 February 2002
- Preceded by: Tsay Jaw-yang
- Succeeded by: Kuo Yao-chi

Personal details
- Born: June 1, 1953 (age 73) Tainan, Taiwan
- Education: National Taiwan University (BE); Ohio State University (MA, PhD)

Lin Neng-pai (Chinese: 林能白; pinyin: Lín Néngbái; born June 1, 1953) is a Taiwanese engineer. He was the minister of the Public Construction Commission from 2000 to 2002.

== Early life and education ==
Lin was born in Tainan, Taiwan, on June 1, 1953. He graduated from National Taiwan University with a Bachelor of Engineering (B.E.) in 1975, then pursued doctoral studies in the United States. He earned a Master of Arts (M.A.) and his Ph.D. in business administration and operations management from Ohio State University in 1989. His doctoral dissertation, completed under Professor Lee J. Krajewski, was titled, "Master production scheduling in uncertain environments".
