= Ou Chin-der =

Taiwanese civil engineer and politician (born 1944)

- 歐晉德
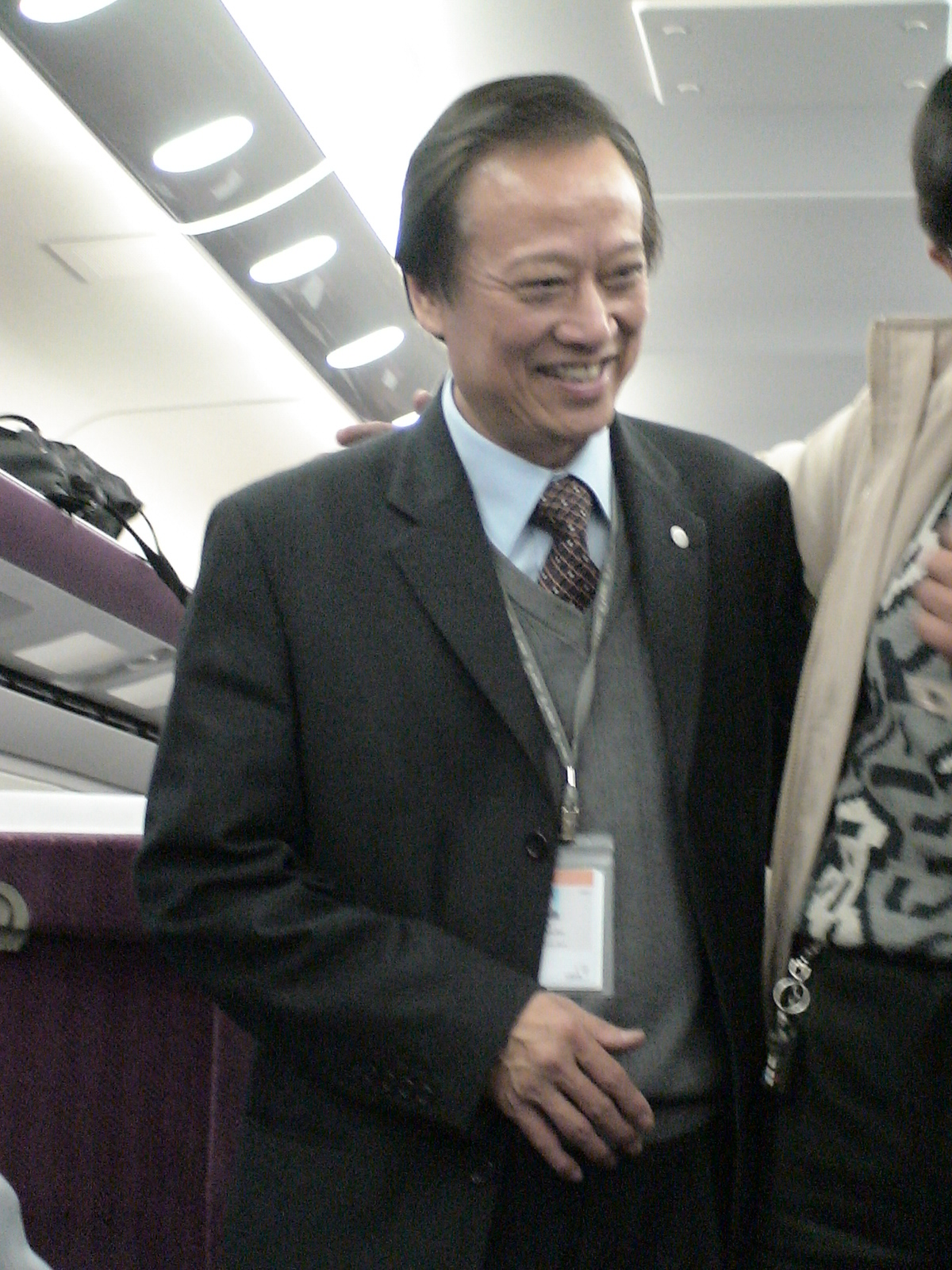

Minister of Public Construction Commission of the Republic of China
- In office 8 June 1996 – 25 December 1999
- Preceded by: Arthur Y. Chen
- Succeeded by: Lee Chien-chung (acting); Tsay Jaw-yang

Personal details
- Born: November 19, 1944 (age 81)
- Education: National Cheng Kung University (BS, MS); Case Western Reserve University (PhD)

Ou Chin-der (Chinese: 歐晉德; pinyin: Ōu Jìndé; born November 19, 1944) is a Taiwanese civil engineer.

== Early life and education ==
Ou was an immigrant who moved from the mainland China to the Taitung County of eastern Taiwan with his parents. He graduated and received his master's degree of civil engineering from National Cheng Kung University, and earned a Ph.D. in soil mechanics at Case Western Reserve University.

== Career ==
Ou became an official of the government of Republic of China, Taiwan in the late 1980s. He served as the director of Taiwan's National Expressway Engineering Bureau from 1990 to 1995, and the chairman of Public Construction Commission of Executive Yuan, the central government of Taiwan, from 1996 to 1998. Ou took part in several key public projects, such as the Sun Yat-sen Freeway, the No. 2 Northern Freeway and the Taipei-Yilan Freeway.

Later Ou transited to act as the political deputy mayor of Taipei City between 1998 and 2004. He gained public recognition and wide popularity for his effort during the 1999 Chichi earthquake and SARS outbreak, and has since become the leading expert of crisis management in Taiwan.

Ou left his post as the deputy mayor of Taipei in August 2004 and became the chairman of Taipei City Government owned Taipei Smart Card Corporation, a company which operates the EasyCard contactless smartcard system for use on the Taipei Metro. During his term, Ou successfully pushed the sales of EasyCard over 6 million in just a few years.

Due to his civil engineering background and political prestige, Ou became chief executive officer of Taiwan High Speed Rail Corporation (THSRC), a private company which holds and manages the Taiwan High Speed Rail, the high-speed rail system of Taiwan, and its related services, on October 1, 2006, just a few months before operation began on January 5, 2007.

Although Ou left his public post to work in the private sector in 2004, he still has been widely anticipated as a potential candidate in several key elections and official posts, including the 2006 Taipei mayoral elections and the ROC presidential election of 2008, though Ou has expressed interest in the continued development of Taiwan High Speed Rail instead of returning to politics.

Ou became the chairman of the board of THSRC on September 22, 2009, while still holding the position of chief executive officer, following the takeover of the company's board by the Taiwanese government. Taiwan High Speed Rail was expected to achieve break-even cash flows for the first time in 2011.

Ou stepped down from the chairmanship of the THSRC in March 2014.
