= Tsay Jaw-yang =

Taiwanese politician

- 蔡兆陽

Minister of Public Construction Commission of the Republic of China
- In office 27 January 1999 – 20 May 2000
- Preceded by: Ou Chin-der; Lee Chien-chung (acting)
- Succeeded by: Lin Neng-pai

Minister of Transportation and Communications of the Republic of China
- In office 10 June 1996 – 31 March 1998
- Preceded by: Liu Chao-shiuan
- Succeeded by: Lin Fong-cheng

Administrative Deputy Minister of Transportation and Communications of the Republic of China
- In office 1994–1996

Personal details
- Born: 2 January 1941 Yunlin, Taiwan, Empire of Japan
- Died: 12 July 2008 (aged 67)
- Cause of death: Pneumonia
- Education: National Cheng Kung University

Tsay Jaw-yang (Chinese: 蔡兆陽; pinyin: Cài Zhàoyáng; 2 January 1941 – 12 July 2008) was a Taiwanese politician who served as Minister of Transportation and Communications from 1996 to 1998. He died of pneumonia on July 12, 2008, at the age of 67.
