= Arthur Y. Chen =

Politician from Taiwan

- 陳豫

Minister of Public Construction Commission of the Republic of China
- In office 20 July 1995 – 8 June 1996
- Preceded by: Position established
- Succeeded by: Ou Chin-der

Arthur Y. Chen (traditional Chinese: 陳豫; simplified Chinese: 陈豫; pinyin: Chén Yù) is a Taiwanese politician. He was the first Minister of Public Construction Commission in 1995–1996.
