= Chen Shi-shuenn =

Taiwanese civil engineer

- 陳希舜

Minister of the Public Construction Commission
- In office 22 October 2013 – 30 June 2014
- Deputy: Yan Jeou-rong, Teng Min-chih
- Preceded by: Chern Jenn-chuan; Yan Jeou-rong (acting)

Minister without Portfolio
- Incumbent
- Assumed office 22 October 2013

Personal details
- Education: National Taiwan University (BS); University of Delaware (MS); University of California, Berkeley (PhD)

Chen Shi-shuenn (Chinese: 陳希舜; pinyin: Chén Xīshùn) is a Taiwanese civil engineer. He served as the Minister of the Public Construction Commission (PCC) of the Executive Yuan from 2013 to 2014.

== Education ==
Chen graduated from National Taiwan University with a bachelor's degree in civil engineering, then completed graduate studies in the United States, where he earned a Master of Science (M.S.) in civil engineering from the University of Delaware and his Ph.D. in civil engineering from the University of California, Berkeley, in 1987. His doctoral dissertation was titled, "The Response of Multilayered Systems to Dynamic Surface Loads."

== Early career ==
He was a professor of construction engineering at National Taiwan University of Science and Technology.

== Political career ==
In 1995–1996, Chen was the Deputy Director-General of the National Expressway Engineering Bureau of the Ministry of Transportation and Communications. In 1999–2001, he was the member of Disaster Prevention and Safety Committee of the Ministry of the Interior. In 2005–2009, he was the member of Public Construction Commission.
