= Liu Shou-cheng =

Taiwanese politician

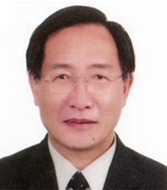

11th Magistrate of Yilan County
- In office 20 December 1997 – 20 December 2005
- Preceded by: Yu Shyi-kun
- Succeeded by: Lu Kuo-hua

Personal details
- Born: 20 March 1951 (age 75) Yilan, Taiwan
- Party: Democratic Progressive Party
- Education: National Chengchi University (BA); Fu Jen Catholic University (MA, PhD)
- Profession: Philosopher

Liu Shou-cheng (Chinese: 劉守成; pinyin: Lióu Shǒuchéng; Wade–Giles: Liú Shǒu-chéng; born 20 March 1951) is a Taiwanese politician. A member of the Democratic Progressive Party, he served as the magistrate of Yilan County from 1997 to 2005.

== Education ==
Liu earned a bachelor's degree in philosophy from National Chengchi University, then earned a master's degree and his Ph.D. in philosophy, both from Fu Jen Catholic University.

== Personal ==
Liu is married to Tien Chiu-chin.

Government offices
Preceded by Yu Shyi-kun	Magistrate of Yilan County; 1997–2005	Succeeded by Lu Kuo-hua
