= National Kaohsiung University of Science and Technology =

University located in Kaohsiung, Taiwan

- 國立高雄科技大學
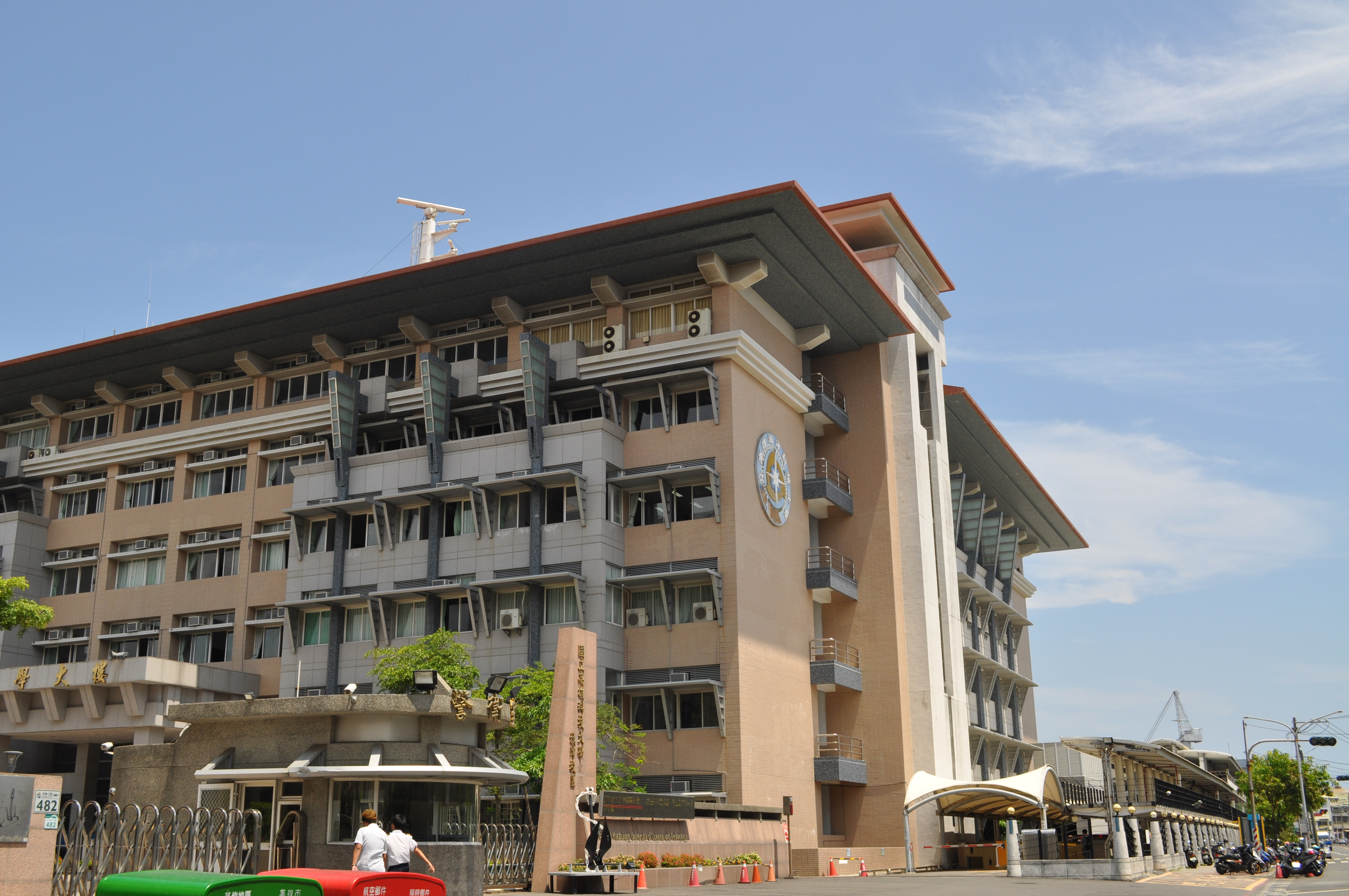
- Former names: National Kaohsiung First University of Science and Technology; National Kaohsiung Marine University; National Kaohsiung University of Applied Sciences
- Motto: 親產優質、創新創業、海洋科技(Pe̍h-ōe-jī: Chhin-sán iu-chit, chhòng-sin chhòng-gia̍p, hái-iûⁿ kho-ki)
- Type: Public university
- Established: 1 February 2018
- President: Ching-Yu Yang
- Academic staff: 1649
- Students: 28010
- Location: Kaohsiung, Taiwan; 22°39′5.6″N 120°19′42″E
- Campus: 5
- Colors
- Nickname: NKUST
- Website: eng.nkust.edu.tw

Chinese name
- Traditional Chinese: 國立高雄科技大學
- Simplified Chinese: 国立高雄科技大学
- Tongyong Pinyin: Guólì Gaosyóng Kejìdàsyué
Transcriptions
Standard Mandarin
- Hanyu Pinyin: Guólì Gāoxióng Kējìdàxué
- Bopomofo: ㄍㄨㄛˊ ㄌㄧˋ ㄍㄠ ㄒㄩㄥˊ ㄎㄜ ㄐㄧˋ ㄉㄚˋ ㄒㄩㄝˊ
- Wade–Giles: Kuo^{2}-li^{4} Kao^{1}-hsiung^{2} K‘o^{1}-chi^{4}-ta^{4}-hsüeh^{2}
- Tongyong Pinyin: Guólì Gaosyóng Kejìdàsyué
- IPA: [kwǒ.lî káʊ.ɕjʊ̌ŋ kʰɤ́.tɕî.tâ.ɕɥě]
Yue: Cantonese
- Yale Romanization: Gwoklaahp Gōuhùhng Fōgeihdaaihhohk
- Jyutping: gwok3 laap6 gou1 hung4 fo1 gei6 daai6 hok6
- IPA: [kʷɔk̚˧.lap̚˨ kɔw˥.hʊŋ˩ fɔ˥.kej˨.taj˨.hɔk̚˨]
Southern Min
- Hokkien POJ: Kok-li̍p Ko-hiông Kho-ki-tai-ha̍k

National Kaohsiung University of Science and Technology (NKUST; Chinese: 國立高雄科技大學; pinyin: Guólì Gāoxióng Kējì Dàxué; Pe̍h-ōe-jī: Kok-li̍p Ko-hiông Kho-ki-tai-ha̍k) is a university located in Kaohsiung, Taiwan.

NKUST offers undergraduate and graduate programs in various fields such as engineering, business, management, design, humanities, and social sciences.

NKUST has a number of research centers and institutes such as the center for Photonics and Optoelectronic Materials, the Institute of Biomedical Engineering, and the Institute of Polymer Science and Engineering.

== History ==
The university was formed in 2018 by a merger of the National Kaohsiung First University of Science and Technology (NKFUST), the National Kaohsiung University of Applied Sciences (KUAS) and the National Kaohsiung Marine University (NKMU).

== Academic Ranking ==
National Kaohsiung University of Science and Technology rankings

Global – Overall
- THE World: 1501+ (2023)

Regional – Overall
- QS Asia: 551–600 (2024)
- THE Asia: 501–600 (2023)

National – Overall
- THE National: 30–42 (2023)

== Campus ==
=== First Campus ===
Located in Yanchao and Nanzih Districts. The campus was formerly the National Kaohsiung First University of Science and Technology.

=== Jiangong Campus ===
Located in Sanmin District. The campus was formerly the National Kaohsiung University of Applied Sciences.

=== Nanzih Campus ===
Located in Nanzih District. The campus was formerly the National Kaohsiung Marine University.

=== Cijin Campus ===
Located in Cijin District. The campus was formerly the National Kaohsiung Marine University.

=== Yanchao Campus ===
Located in Yanchao District.

Campus of NKUST

== See also ==
- List of universities in Taiwan
