= Lin Tsung-hsien =

Taiwanese politician

- 林聰賢
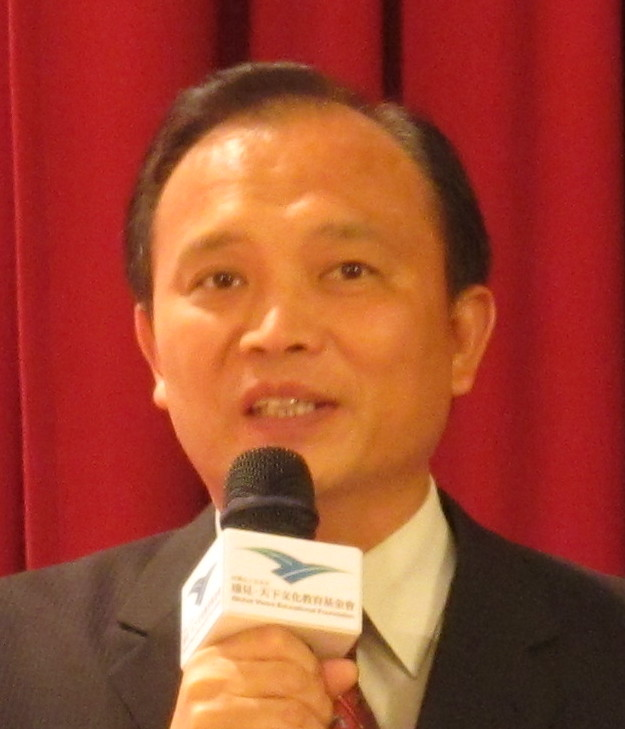

Minister of the Council of Agriculture
- In office 8 February 2017 – 1 December 2018
- Prime Minister: Lin Chuan; William Lai
- Deputy: Chen Chi-chung, Huang Jin-cheng, Li Tui-zhi
- Preceded by: Tsao Chi-hung
- Succeeded by: Chen Chi-chung

Magistrate of Yilan County
- In office 20 December 2009 – 8 February 2017
- Deputy: Wu Tze-cheng
- Preceded by: Lu Kuo-hua
- Succeeded by: Wu Tze-cheng (acting); Chen Chin-te (acting); Lin Zi-miao

Personal details
- Born: 22 February 1962 (age 64) Luodong, Yilan County, Taiwan
- Party: Democratic Progressive Party (since 1998)
- Education: Chiayi Agricultural College (BS); Fo Guang University (MS)

Lin Tsung-hsien or Lin Tsong-shyan (Chinese: 林聰賢; pinyin: Lín Cōngxián; born 22 February 1962) is a Taiwanese politician. He was elected Yilan County Magistrate in 2009 and served until 2017, when he was appointed to lead the Council of Agriculture.

== Education and early career ==
Lin was born in Luodong to a family of farmers, and received his bachelor's degree from Chiayi Agricultural College and master's degree from Fo Guang University. Upon completion of mandatory military service, Lin became an insurance agent.

== Political career ==
Lin became active in Luodong Township's local politics in 1988, having worked his way up to the position of district secretary-general by 1994. In 1998, Lin joined the Democratic Progressive Party. In February 2002, he became the mayor of Luodong Township, serving for two terms until December 2009.

=== Yilan County Magistracy ===
Lin assumed the magistracy of Yilan County on 20 December 2009 after winning the 2009 Republic of China local election on 5 December 2009 under the Democratic Progressive Party.

2009 Yilan County Magistrate Election Result
No.	Candidate	Party	Votes	Percentage
1	Lin Tsung-hsien	DPP	133,394	54.26%
2	Lu Kuo-hua	KMT	112,469	45.74%

During his first term as county magistrate, Lin improved the county's standing through reform. He also restored the annual Yilan International Children's Folklore and Folkgame Festival which was suspended by his predecessor Lu Kuo-hua. Lin had also supported several agricultural policies, such as banning chemical herbicides in farms and ending the use of unprocessed manure as fertilizer. In terms of housing development, he had created regulations on farmhouses and reduced the number of residential buildings permitted on farmland.

On 29 November 2014, Lin won the Yilan County magistrate election as the DPP candidate.

2014 Yilan County Magistrate Election Result
No.	Candidate	Party	Votes	Percentage
1	Lin Tsung-hsien	DPP	160,253	63.95%
2	Chiou Shu-ti (邱淑媞)	KMT	90,320	36.05%

In his second term, Lin supported Ko Wen-je's proposal to build a railway connecting Yilan and Taipei. However, the project drew harsh criticism for its predicted negative effects on the environment.

=== Minister of Agriculture ===
Lin was appointed the head of the Council of Agriculture in February 2017. He resigned the position on 1 December 2018.
