= National Kaohsiung Marine University =

Coordinates: 22°43′35″N 120°18′53″E

- 國立高雄海洋科技大學
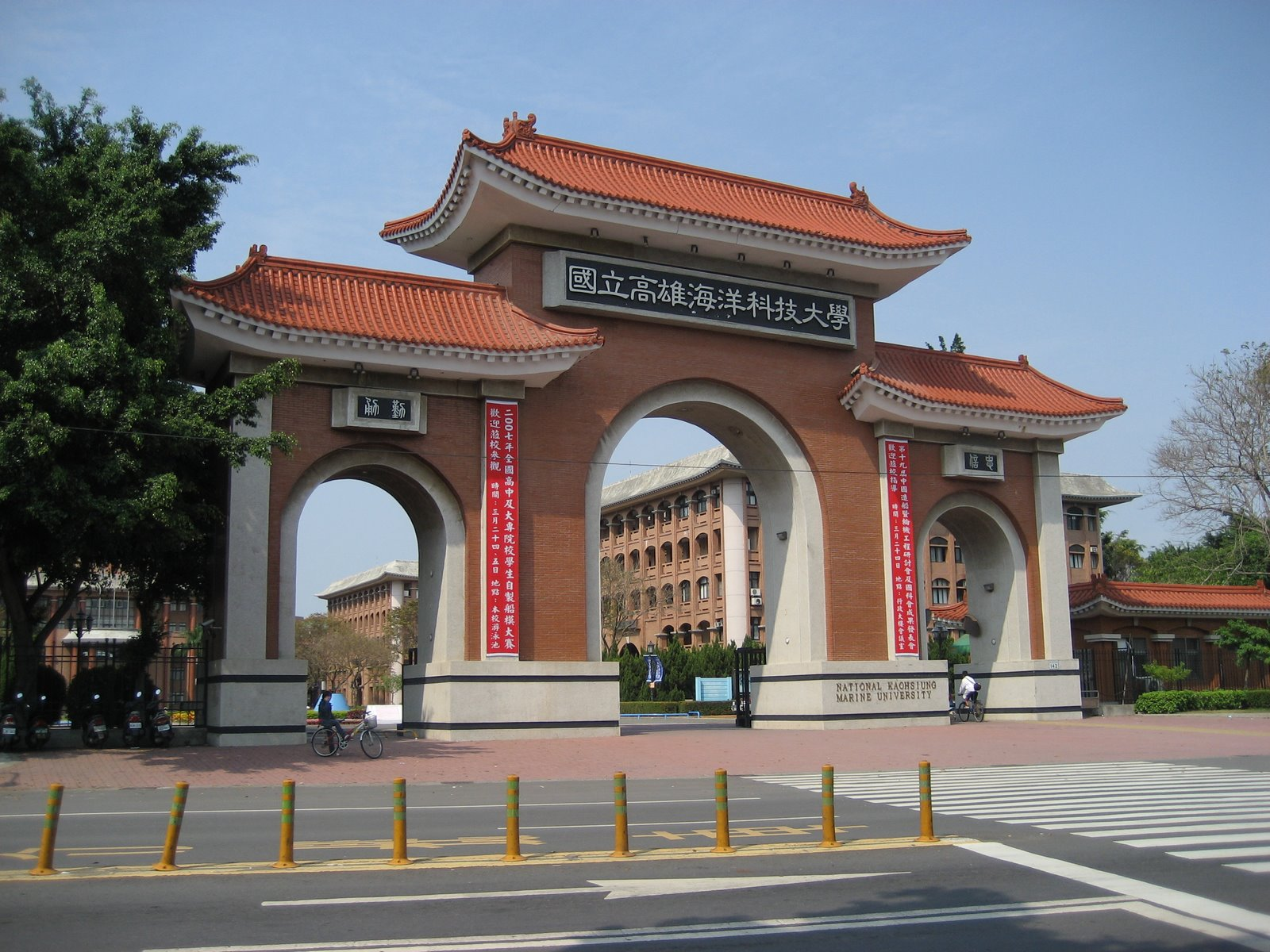
- Motto: 忠、信、勤、勇
- Motto in English: loyalty, trustworthiness, industriousness and bravery
- Type: Public
- Active: 1946–31 January 2018
- President: Chou, Chao-Jen, Ph.D.
- Location: Nanzih and Cijin, Kaohsiung, Taiwan
- Campus: 45.9 acres (0.186 km^{2})
- Website: www.nkmu.edu.tw

National Kaohsiung Marine University
- Traditional Chinese: 國立高雄海洋科技大學
Transcriptions
Standard Mandarin
- Hanyu Pinyin: Guólì Gāoxióng Hǎiyáng Kējì Dàxué

National Kaohsiung Marine University (NKMU; Chinese: 國立高雄海洋科技大學) was a university in Nanzih District, Kaohsiung, Taiwan. The current total number of students is 8,000. In 2018, it has been merged into the "Nanzih Campus" and "Cijin Campus" of National Kaohsiung University of Science and Technology.

== History ==
In order to increase the economic and trade development of southern Taiwan, the government established the Kaohsiung branch of the Provincial Keelung Marine and Fishery Senior Vocational School in 1946. Two years later, the Kaohsiung branch became the independent Kaohsiung Marine and Fishery Senior Vocational School. In a very short time, the School became the driving force behind the development of marine-related industries in southern Taiwan. With the rapid economic and trade development of the nation and the increasing demand for marine professionals, the School was elevated to the status of junior college in 1967. Graduates from two-year programs were competitively sought after. In 1997, the government elevated the College's status to institute of technology allowing it to provide opportunities for advance study to vocational school graduates. At the same time, the school started to recruit university students. As graduates entered the workplace, the marine industries received a fresh burst of energy. In 2004, the university was renamed National Kaohsiung Marine University.

== Faculties ==
- College of Hydrosphere Science
- College of Management
- College of Maritime Affairs
- College of Ocean Engineering

== See also ==
- List of universities in Taiwan
