= Fan Liang-shiow =

Taiwanese politician (born 1946)

- 范良銹

Minister of Public Construction Commission of the Republic of China
- In office 20 May 2008 – 1 April 2011
- Preceded by: Wu Tze-cheng
- Succeeded by: Lee Hong-yuan

Personal details
- Born: 15 August 1946 (age 79)
- Education: National Chiao Tung University (BS, MS)

Fan Liang-shiow (Chinese: 范良銹; pinyin: Fàn Liángxiù; born 15 August 1946) is a Taiwanese politician. He served as the Minister of the Public Construction Commission of the Executive Yuan from 2008 to 2011.

== Education ==
Fan obtained his master's degree in traffic and transportation from National Chiao Tung University.
