= Yilan County Constituency =

Constituency of the Legislative Yuan of Taiwan

Yilan County
- Single-member constituency for the Legislative Yuan
- District: Yilan County
- Electorate: 373,510

Current constituency
- Created: 2008
- Number of members: 1

Yilan County is represented in the Legislative Yuan since 2008 by one at-large single-member constituency (Yilan County Constituency, Chinese: 宜蘭縣選舉區; pinyin: Yílán Xiàn Xuǎnjǔ Qū). With an electorate of 357,077 persons in 2016, it is the least-represented constituency since the split of Hsinchu County Constituency.

== Current district ==
- Yilan County

== Legislators ==
Kuomintang Democratic Progressive Party

Election	Yilan County
2008 7th	Lin Chien-jung
2012 8th	Chen Ou-po
2016 9th	Chen Ou-po
2020 10th	Chen Ou-po
2024 11th	Chen Chun-yu

== Election results ==
2016 Legislative election
	Elected			Runner-up		
Incumbent	Candidate	Party	Votes (%)	Candidate	Party	Votes (%)
DPP; Chen Ou-po	Chen Ou-po	DPP	53.68%	Li Zhiyong	Kuomintang	28.25%
