= Lu Kuo-hua =

Taiwanese politician (born 1956)

- 呂國華
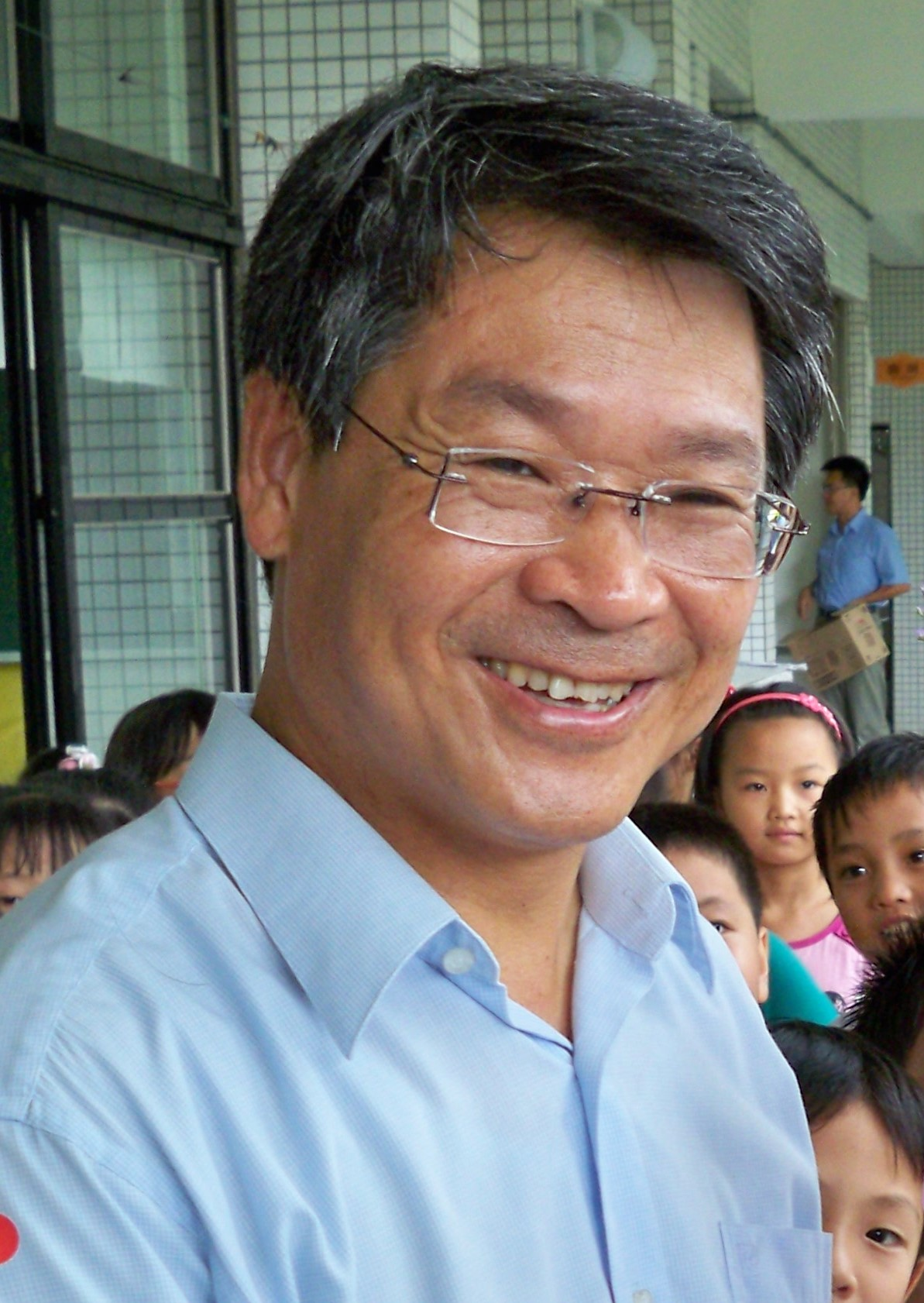

Magistrate of Yilan County
- In office 20 December 2005 – 20 December 2009
- Preceded by: Liu Shou-cheng
- Succeeded by: Lin Tsung-hsien

Personal details
- Born: 22 February 1956 (age 69) Toucheng, Yilan County, Taiwan
- Political party: Kuomintang
- Education: Fu Jen Catholic University (BA); National Taiwan University (MA)

Lu Kuo-hua (traditional Chinese: 呂國華; simplified Chinese: 吕国华; pinyin: Lǚ Guóhuá; born 22 February 1956) is a politician in the Republic of China. He was the Magistrate of Yilan County from 2005 to 2009.

== Education ==
Lu graduated from Fu Jen Catholic University with a bachelor's degree in sociology then earned a master's degree from National Taiwan University.

== Yilan County Magistrate ==
=== 2005 Yilan County magistrate election ===
Lu was elected Magistrate of Yilan County after winning the 2005 Republic of China local election as the Kuomintang candidate on 3 December 2005. He took office on 20 December 2005.

2005 Yilan County Magistrate Election Result
No.	Candidate	Party	Votes	Percentage
1	Chen Ding-nan	DPP	112,853	47.75%
2	Xie Lijingyi	Independent	2,020	0.85%
3	Lu Kuo-hua	KMT	121,463	51.40%

=== 2009 Yilan County magistrate election ===
Lu joined the 2009 Republic of China local election on 5 December 2009 representing the Kuomintang. However, he lost to Democratic Progressive Party candidate Lin Tsung-hsien.

2009 Yilan County Magistrate Election Result
No.	Candidate	Party	Votes	Percentage
1	Lin Tsung-hsien	DPP	133,394	54.26%
2	Lu Kuo-hua	KMT	112,469	45.74%
