= Wu Tze-cheng =

Taiwanese politician

- 吳澤成
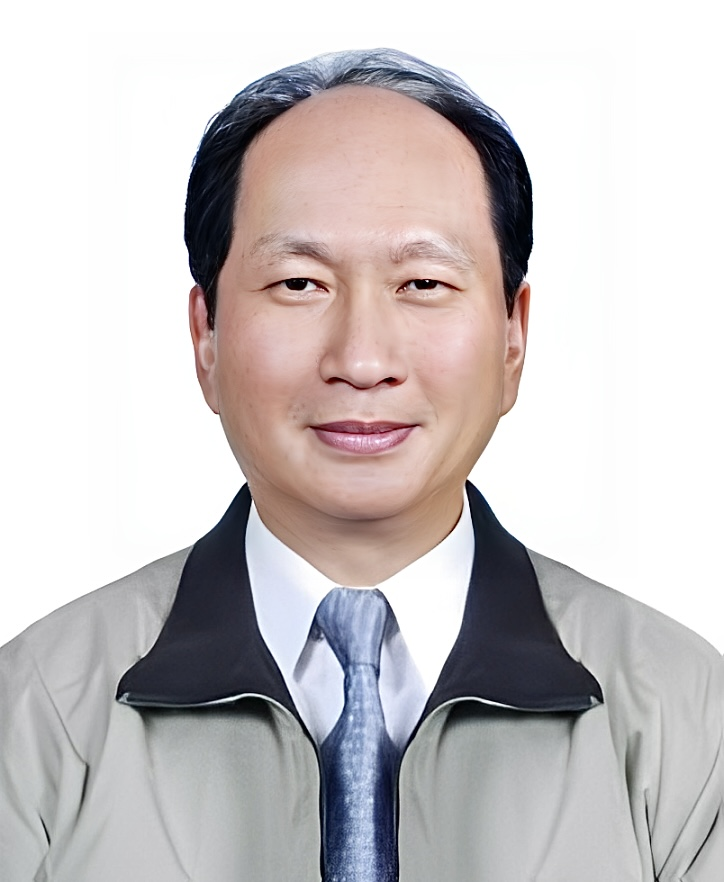
- Official portrait, 2017

6th & 13th Minister of Public Construction
- In office 23 November 2017 – 20 May 2024
- Prime Minister: Lai Ching-te; Su Tseng-chang; Chen Chien-jen
- Preceded by: Wu Hong-mo
- Succeeded by: Dereck Chen
- In office 25 January 2006 – 20 May 2008
- Prime Minister: Su Tseng-chang; Chang Chun-hsiung
- Preceded by: Kuo Yao-chi
- Succeeded by: Fan Liang-shiow

Minister without Portfolio
- In office 7 November 2017 – 20 May 2024
- Prime Minister: Lai Ching-te; Su Tseng-chang; Chen Chien-jen
- In office 25 January 2006 – 20 May 2008
- Prime Minister: Su Tseng-chang; Chang Chun-hsiung

25th Chairman of the Provincial Government
- In office 6 November 2017 – 30 June 2018 (Note: Titled as chairman of the Taiwan Provincial Government; as a governor that was appointed by the Executive Yuan.)
- Appointed by: Executive Yuan
- Prime Minister: William Lai
- Preceded by: Hsu Jan-yau
- Succeeded by: Position abolished

Acting Magistrate of Yilan
- In office 8 February 2017 – 6 November 2017
- Deputy: Chu Shou-chian
- Preceded by: Lin Tsung-hsien
- Succeeded by: Dereck Chen (acting)

Deputy Magistrate of Yilan
- In office 20 December 2009 – 7 February 2017
- Magistrate: Lin Tsung-hsien
- Preceded by: Lin Yi-kang
- Succeeded by: Chu Shou-chian

Personal details
- Born: 15 December 1945 (age 80) Jiaoxi, Yilan County, Taiwan
- Party: Independent
- Education: National Central University (BS, MS)

Wu Tze-cheng, sometimes transliterated Wu Ze-Cheng, (Chinese: 吳澤成; pinyin: Wú Zéchéng; born 15 December 1945) is a Taiwanese politician who served as the minister without portfolio of the executive yuan and the minister of the Public Construction Commission. He had also served as the acting Magistrate of Yilan County and the last governor of the Taiwan provincial government.

== Education ==
Wu obtained his master's degree in construction engineering and management from National Central University.

== Yilan County Government ==
On 14 October 2015, Deputy Magistrate Wu, representing Yilan County Government, held a talk with Deputy Mayor Lin Chin-rong, representing Taipei City Government, at Taipei City Hall in Taipei on the collaboration between the county and the city on the railways, public bus services and terminals, traffic congestion reduction on Freeway 5 and the spiritual relocation of Chiang Wei-shui.
