= Yilan County Council =

Legislature of Yilan County, Taiwan

Coordinates: 24.7295°N 121.7645°E

Yilan County Council 宜蘭縣議會

Type
- Type: County Council

Leadership
- Speaker: Zhang Sheng-de (KMT)
- Deputy Speaker: Chen Han-zhong (Independent)

Structure
- Seats: 34
- Political groups: KMT (13); DPP (11); ZSM (1); Independent (10)

Elections
- Voting system: Single non-transferable vote
- Last election: 2022

Meeting place
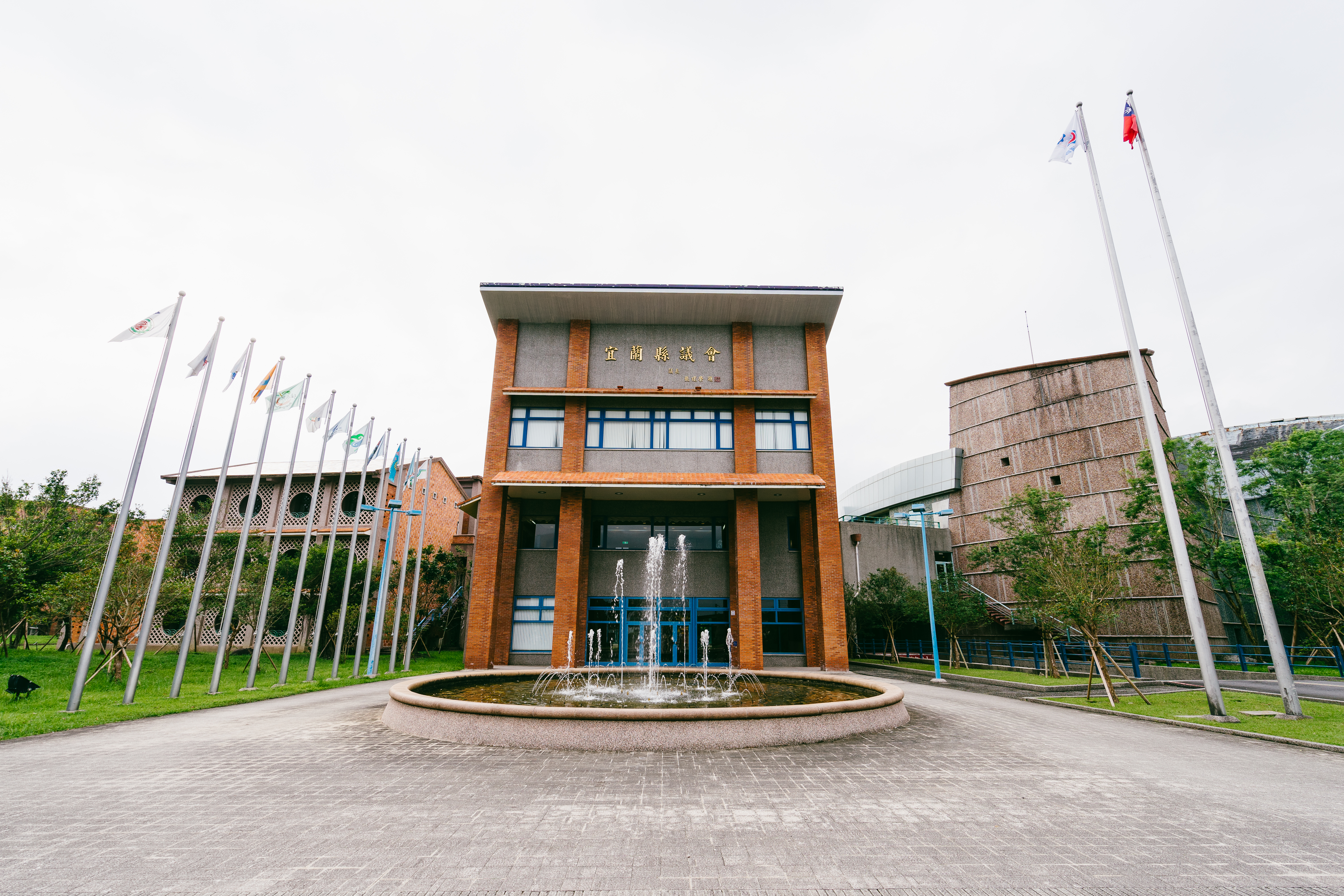
- Yilan City, Yilan County, Taiwan

Website
- Official website

The Yilan County Council (ILCC; traditional Chinese: 宜蘭縣議會; simplified Chinese: 宜兰县议会; pinyin: Yilán Xiàn Yìhuì) is the elected county council of Yilan County, Taiwan. The council composes of 34 councilors elected in local elections held every four years.

== History ==
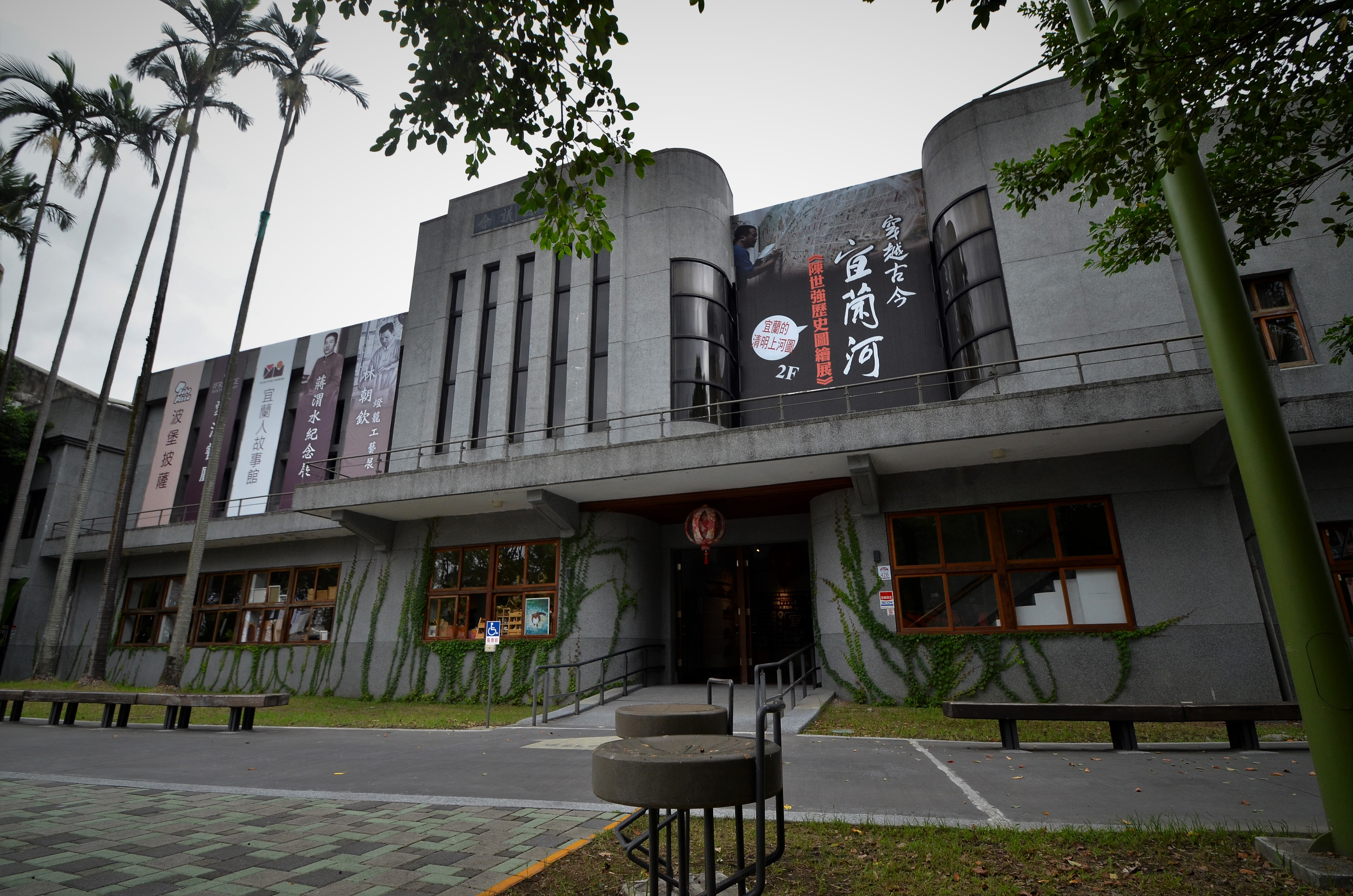
Former Yilan County Council building which now houses the Yilan Story Museum

After the handover of Taiwan from Japan to the Republic of China in 1945, county assembly was set up according to the Institute of Organization for City and County Councils in 1946. In April 1950, the Taiwan Provincial Government promulgated the Outline for Implementing Local Autonomy for Cities and Counties. The administrative regions were reconfigured in September and the Yilan County Council was founded on 24 February 1951.

== Organization ==
- Speaker
- Deputy Speaker
- Councilors

=== Agenda Department ===
- Regular Meeting
- Provisional Meeting
- Procedural Committee
- Disciplinary Committee
- Bill Examination Committee

=== Administration Department ===
- Chief Secretary
- Secretary
- Agenda Section
- General Affairs Section
- Statute Office
- Accounting Office
- Personnel Office

== Transportation ==
The council building is accessible south of Yilan Station of Taiwan Railway.

== See also ==
- Yilan County Government
