= Public Construction Commission =

Government agency in Taiwan

- 公共工程委員會; Gōnggòng Gōngchéng Wěiyuánhuì
- Logo

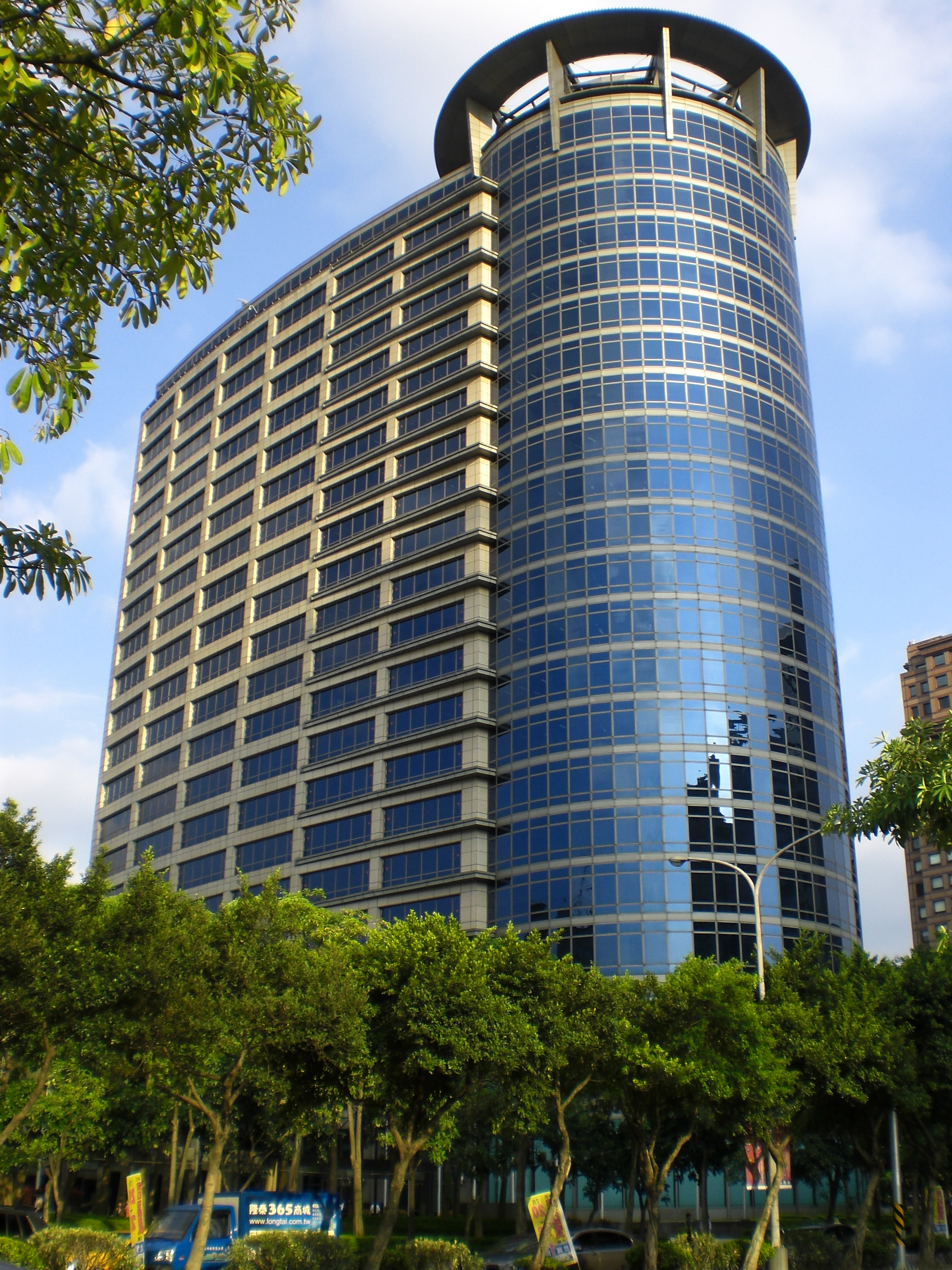

Agency overview
- Formed: 20 July 1995
- Superseding agency: Public Construction Supervisory Board
- Jurisdiction: Republic of China (Taiwan)
- Headquarters: Xinyi, Taipei
- Ministers responsible: Wu Tze-cheng, Minister; Yan Jeou-rong, Yeh Jer-liang (葉哲良), Deputy Minister
- Parent agency: Executive Yuan
- Website: Official website

The Public Construction Commission (PCC; Chinese: 公共工程委員會; pinyin: Gōnggòng Gōngchéng Wěiyuánhuì) is an independent government agency of the Executive Yuan of the Republic of China (Taiwan) which is responsible for planning, reviewing, coordination, and supervision of public construction projects such as roads, bridges, highways in Taiwan. The agency follows national goals such as sustainability, high-quality, efficient, reliable and competitive national infrastructure.

== History ==
The agency was established in 1995 to oversee public works in Taiwan.

== Administrative structure ==
The agency is organized into the following departments.

- Department of Planning
- Department of Technology
- Department of Technology Management
- Secretariat
- Personnel Office
- Accounting Office
- Legal Affairs Committee
- Petitions and Appeals Committee
- Complaint Review Board for Government Procurement
- Engineering Technique Corroboration Committee
- Professional Engineers Disciplinary Retrial Committee
- Central Procurement Supervision Unit
- Congressional Liaison Unit
- Private Participation Unit

== Ministers ==
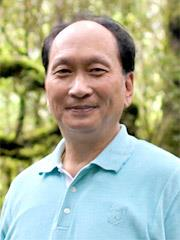
Wu Tze-cheng, the incumbent Minister of Public Construction Commission.

- Arthur Y. Chen (20 July 1995 – 8 June 1996)
- Ou Chin-der (8 June 1996 – 25 December 1998)
  - Lee Chien-chung (25 December 1998 – 27 January 1999) (acting)
- Tsay Jaw-yang (27 January 1999 – 20 May 2000)
- Lin Neng-pai (20 May 2000 – 1 February 2002)
- Kuo Yao-chi (1 February 2002 – 15 January 2006)
- Wu Tze-cheng (15 January 2006 – 20 May 2008)
- Fan Liang-shiow (May 2008 – April 2011)
- Lee Hong-yuan (April 2011 – February 2012)
- Chern Jenn-chuan (February 2012 – 1 August 2013)
  - Yan Jeou-rong (1 August 2013 – 21 October 2013) (acting)
- Chen Shi-shuenn (22 October 2013 – 30 June 2014)
- Hsu Chun-yat (1 July 2014 – 19 May 2016)
- Wu Hong-mo (20 May 2016 – 23 November 2017)
- Wu Tze-cheng (23 November 2017 – 20 May 2024)
- Chen Chin-te (20 May 2024 – incumbent)

== See also ==
- Executive Yuan
- Transportation in Taiwan
