= Yilan County Government =

Government of Yilan County, Taiwan

Coordinates: 24.7309°N 121.7632°E

- 宜蘭縣政府
- Emblem of Yilan County Government

- Seal of the Yilan County Government (宜蘭縣政府印)

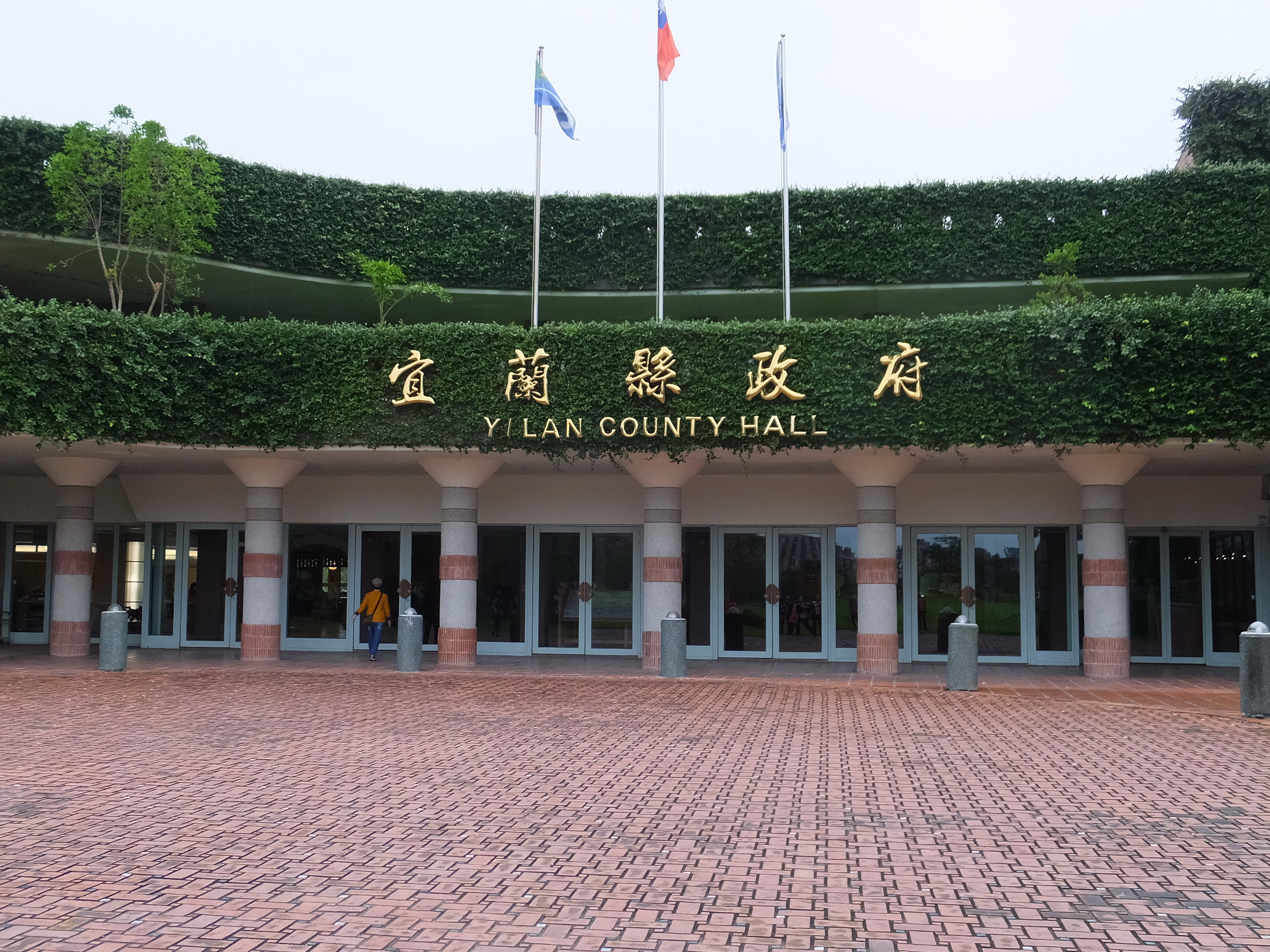

Agency overview
- Jurisdiction: Yilan County
- Headquarters: Yilan City
- Agency executive: Lin Mao-sheng, Magistrate
- Website: Official website

The Yilan County Government (Chinese: 宜蘭縣政府; pinyin: Yilán Xiàn Zhèngfǔ) is the local government of Yilan County, Taiwan.

Yilan County Hall is located in Yilan City, adjacent to Yilan County Council, Yilan District Court and District Attorney's Office.

== Organizational structure ==
=== First class units ===
- Finance Department
- Business and Tourism Department
- Economic Affairs Department
- Public Works Department
- Education Department
- Agriculture Department
- Social Affairs Department
- Land Administration Department
- Secretariat
- Planning Department
- Civil Affairs Department
- Budget, Accounting and Statistic Department
- Personnel Department
- Civil Service Ethics Department
- Labor Affairs Department

=== First organs ===
- Cultural Affairs Bureau
- Environmental Protection Bureau
- Public Health Bureau
- Local Tax Bureau
- Fire Bureau
- Police Bureau

=== Second organs ===
- Family Education Center
- Yilan County Stadium
- Yilan County Animal and Plant Disease Control Center
- Luodong Land Office
- Yilan Land Office
- Mortuary Services Office
- Yilan Household Registration Office
- Loudong Household Registration Office
- Toucheng Household Registration Office
- Su'ao Household Registration Office
- Yuanshan Household Registration Office
- Jhuangwei Household Registration Office
- Dongshan Household Registration Office
- Wujie Household Registration Office
- Datong Household Registration Office
- Nan'ao Household Registration Office
- Jiaoxi Household Registration Office
- Sansing Household Registration Office
- Yilan County Indigenous Peoples Office

== Access ==
The county hall is accessible south of Yilan Station of Taiwan Railway.
