= Shetou (disambiguation) =

Shetou is a rural township in Changhua County, Taiwan.

Shetou may also refer to:

- Shetou (灄頭), southeast of present-day Zaoqiang County, Hebei, see Yao Yizhong
- Shetou railway station, a railway station on the Taiwan Railways Administration West Coast line
- Shetou Mountain (蛇頭山), a mountain in Magong, Penghu, Taiwan, see Fengguiwei Fort
- Shetou Village (社头村), Jiaomei, Longhai City, Zhangzhou, Fujian Province, China
