= Xiwei =

Xiwei may refer to:

- Western Wei (535–557), a dynasty in Northwest China during the Northern and Southern Dynasties period
- Xiwei Bridge, bridge across the Dadu River in Taiwan
- Xiwei, Jilin (西苇), a town in Yitong Manchu Autonomous County, Jilin, China
- Xiwei, Fu'an (溪尾), a town in Fu'an, Fujian, China
- Xiwei Township (溪尾乡), a township in Youxi County, Fujian, China
