= Rainbow Bridge =

Rainbow Bridge may refer to:

== Bridges ==
- Bifröst, a rainbow bridge connecting Asgard to Midgard in Norse myth
- Rainbow Bridge (pets), a location where deceased pets go to wait for reunion with their owners
- Rainbow Bridge in Haleiwa, Hawaii
- Rainbow Bridge, Henan, China, a former bridge depicted in the Qingming Scroll
- Rainbow Bridge (Kansas), US
- Rainbow Bridge (Niagara Falls), on the US–Canadian border
- Rainbow Bridge, Oxford, UK
- Rainbow Bridge, another name for the Medley Footbridge, Oxford, UK
- Rainbow Bridge (Taipei), Taipei, Taiwan
- Rainbow Bridge (Texas), US
- Rainbow Bridge (Tokyo), Japan
- Rainbow Bridge (La Conner, Washington), US
- Rainbow Bridge (Yangzhou), Jiangsu, China, a famed bridge at Slender West Lake
- Caihong Bridge station, Guangzhou, China, a metro station named after a bridge whose Chinese name means Rainbow Bridge.

== Natural features ==
- Rainbow Bridge National Monument, a natural rock formation in Utah, USA

== Arts and entertainment ==
=== Films ===
- Rainbow Bridge (1963 film), a Japanese anime film
- Rainbow Bridge (film), a 1971 film featuring the music of Jimi Hendrix

=== Other arts and entertainment ===
- Rainbow Bridge (album), a 1971 album by Jimi Hendrix
- "Rainbow Bridge" (M*A*S*H), an episode of the television series M*A*S*H
- Rainbow Bridge, a 2019 album by Sematary

== See also ==
- Marsh Rainbow Arch, a bridge design by James Barney Marsh (1856–1936) of the Marsh Engineering Company; seven of these "Rainbow Arch Bridge" crossings in various locations appear on the US National Register of Historic Places
- Rainbow Arch Bridge (disambiguation)
