= Shetou Doushan Temple =

Temple in Shetou, Changhua County, Taiwan

- 寶社頭斗山祠
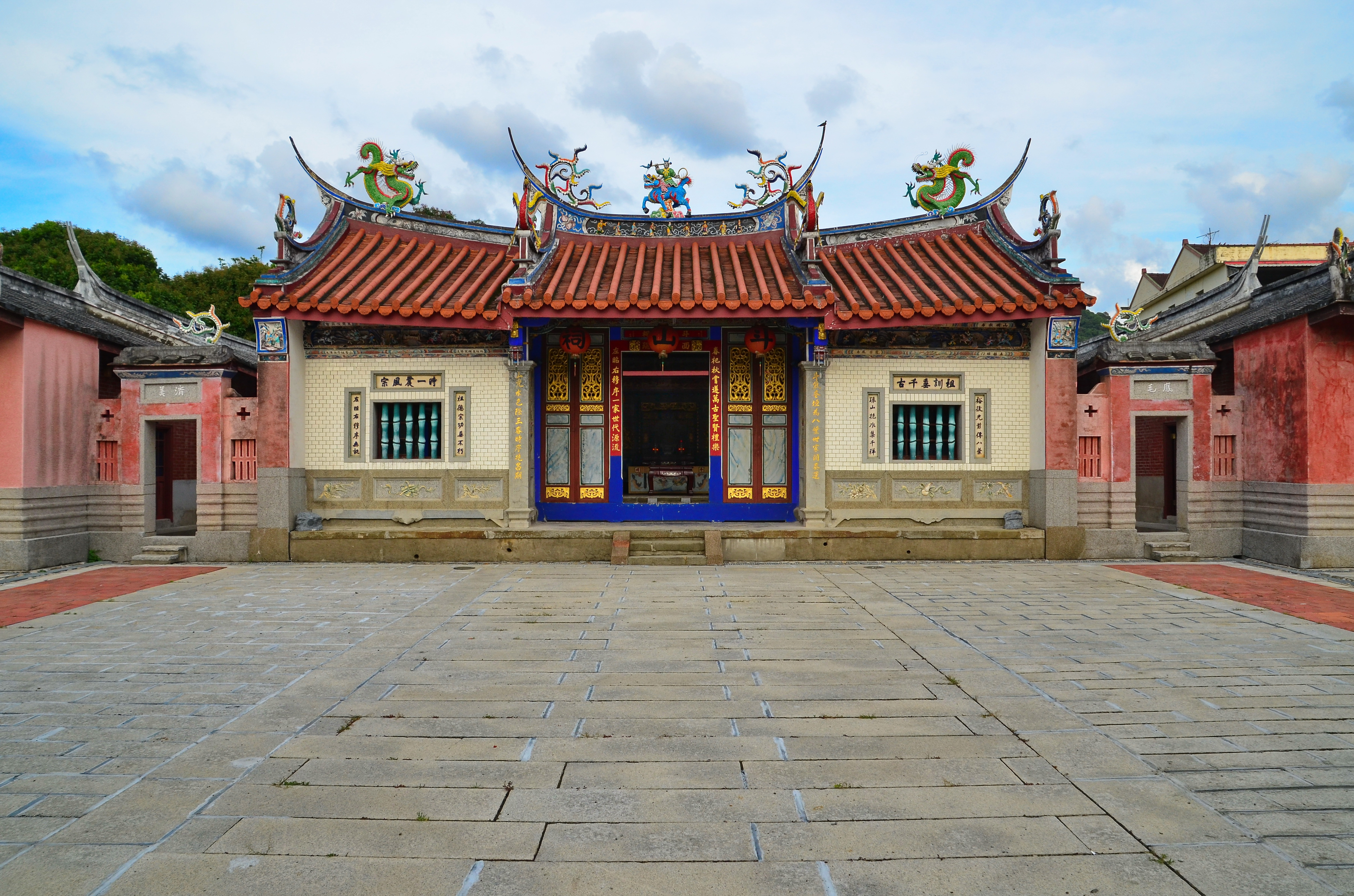

- Location within Changhua County

Location
- Location: Shetou, Changhua County, Taiwan
- Interactive map of Shetou Doushan Temple
- Coordinates: 23°52′58.6″N 120°36′17.7″E

Architecture
- Type: Temple
- Completed: 1880

The Shetou Doushan Temple (traditional Chinese: 社頭斗山祠; simplified Chinese: 社头斗山祠; pinyin: Shètóu Dòushān Cí) is an ancestral temple in Shetou Township, Changhua County, Taiwan.

== History ==
The temple underwent renovation in 1971 in which the verandas at the two sides were changed to a flat-top format.

== Architecture ==
The temple consists of two-wing building and a courtyard. The building consists of front hall and shrine.

== Transportation ==
The temple is accessible southeast from Shetou Station of Taiwan Railway.

== See also ==
- Chinese ancestral veneration
- Fangqiaotou Tianmen Temple
- List of temples in Taiwan
- List of tourist attractions in Taiwan
