= Zhuokou River =

River in Kaohsiung, Taiwan

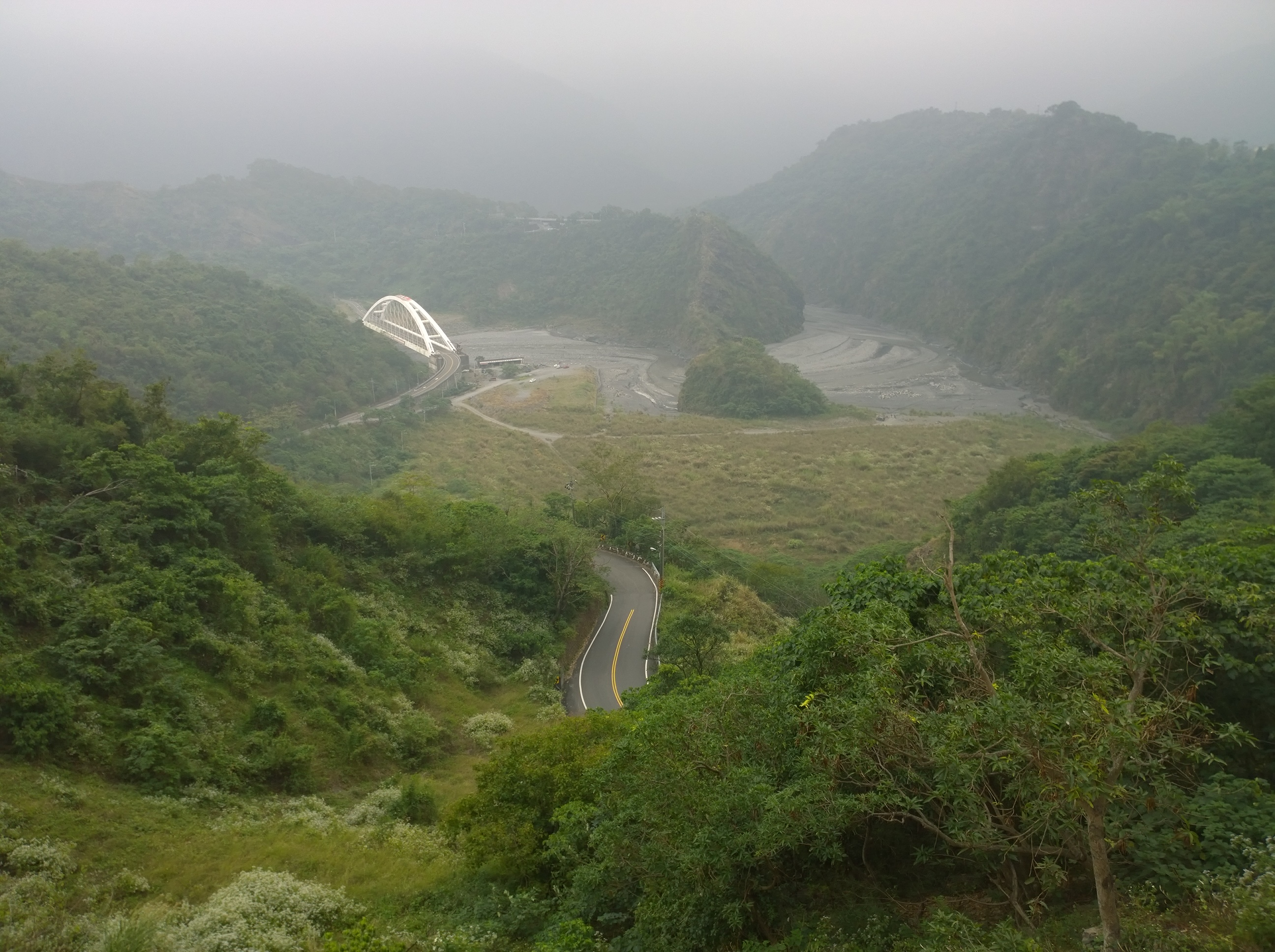

- The location of the confluence of the Zhuokou and Gaoping Rivers

Location
- Country: Taiwan

Physical characteristics
- Source
  - location: Central Mountain Range: Beinan Mountain
  - elevation: 3,293 m (10,804 ft)
- Mouth
  - location: Liouguei
  - coordinates: 22.8844°N 120.6457°E
- Length: 50 km (31 mi)
- Basin size: 378 km^{2} (146 sq mi)
- Discharge
  - location: Nanfeng Bridge
  - average: 37 m^{3}/s (1,300 cu ft/s)
  - minimum: 0.02 m^{3}/s (0.71 cu ft/s)
  - maximum: 1,221 m^{3}/s (43,100 cu ft/s)

Basin features
- River system: Gaoping River

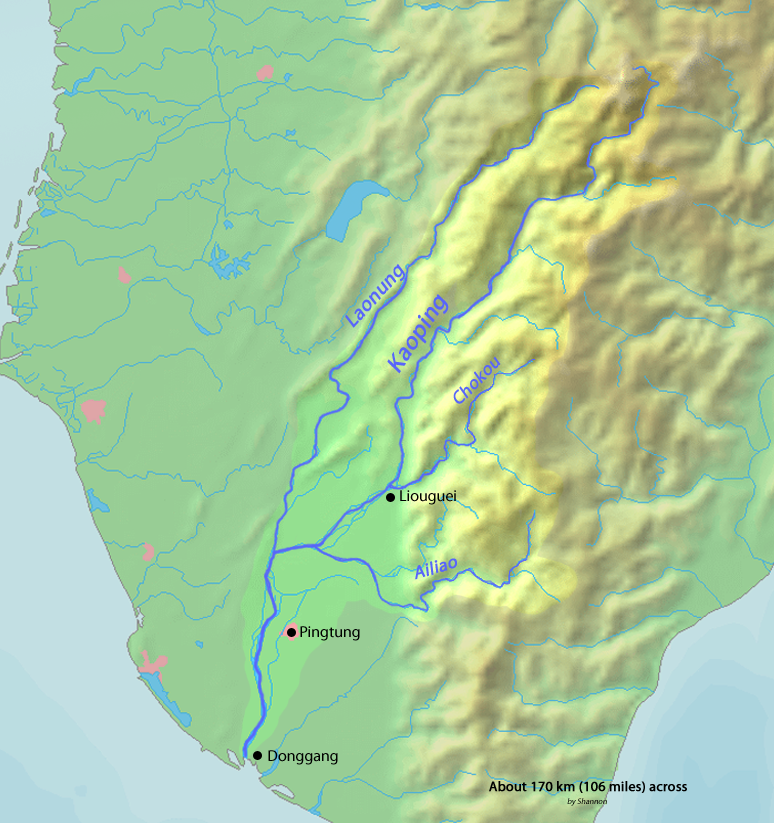
Map of the Gaoping River watershed with Zhuokou on the right

The Zhuokou River, also spelled Chokou River or Jhuokou River (Chinese: 濁口溪; pinyin: Zhuókǒu Xī; Wade–Giles: Cho^{2}-kou^{3} Hsi^{1}), is a tributary of the Laonong River, which in turn is a tributary of the Gaoping River, the main stream of this major river system in southwestern Taiwan. It flows through the Taoyuan and Maolin Districts of Kaohsiung City for 50 km.

== Bridges ==
- Duonagao Suspension Bridge
- Teldreka Bridge

== See also ==
- List of rivers in Taiwan
