= Maolin District =

Mountain indigenous district in Kaohsiung, Taiwan

Coordinates: 22.927409°N 120.745872°E

Maolin 茂林區 Teldreka
- Mountain Indigenous District
- Maolin District
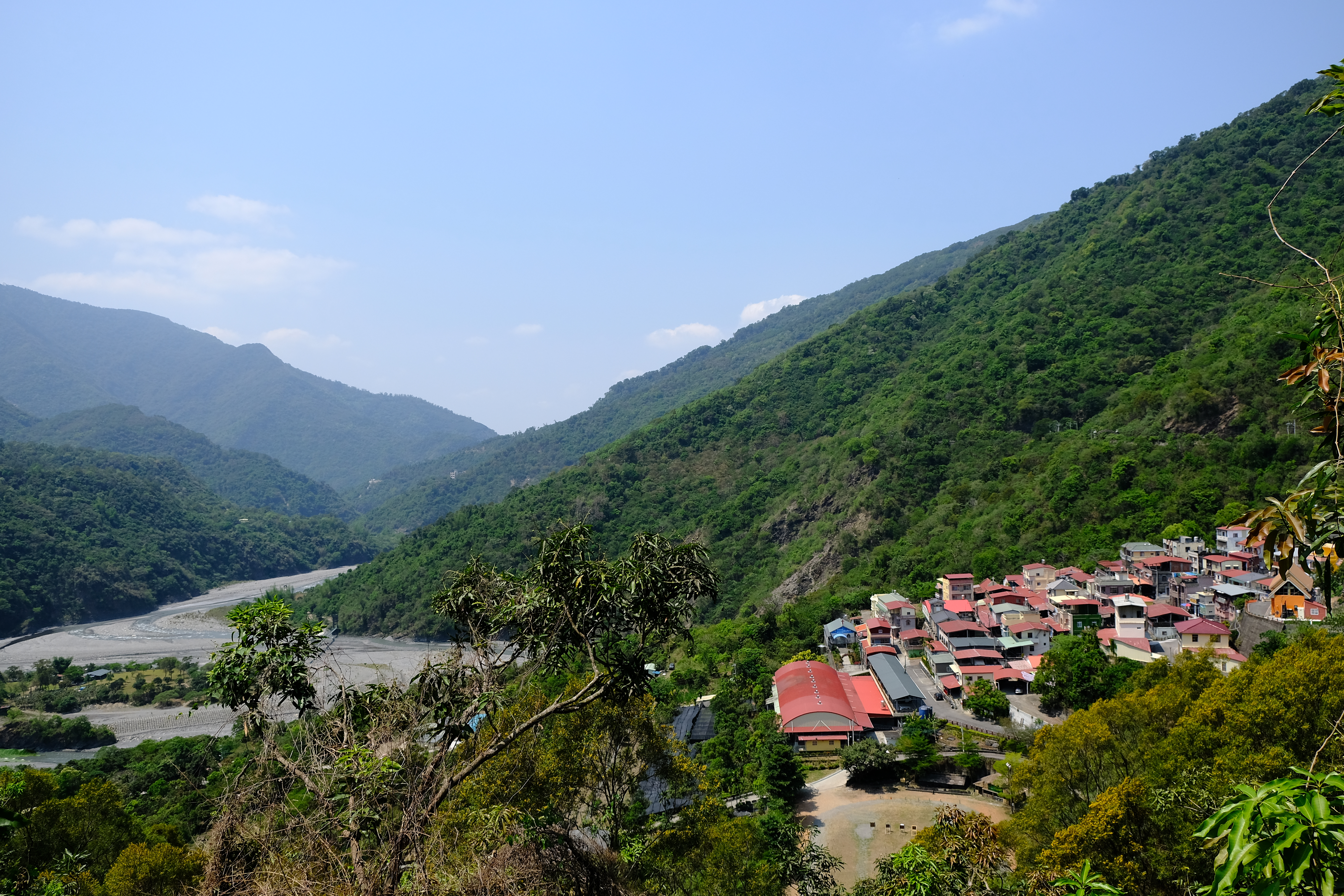
- Wanshan Village

- Miaolin District in Kaohsiung City
- Country: Taiwan
- Municipality: Kaohsiung City
- Boroughs: List: 3 villages

Government
  - Type: District government
  - District chief: Angopaw Komola (KMT)

Population (October 2023)
  - Total: 1,900
- Website: maolin-en.kcg.gov.tw

Maolin District (Rukai: Teldreka; Chinese: 茂林區; pinyin: Màolín Qū) is a mountain indigenous district of Kaohsiung, Taiwan. Maolin is one of the least populated districts in Taiwan, since it is located just to the south of the Central Mountain Range. The height ranges from 230 meters to 2700 meters above sea level, with a hot tropical and humid weather. The main population of Maolin district is the indigenous Rukai people. Maolin is well suited for tourism due to its unique scenery and ecology. Maolin National Scenic Area is located in the district.

== Geography ==
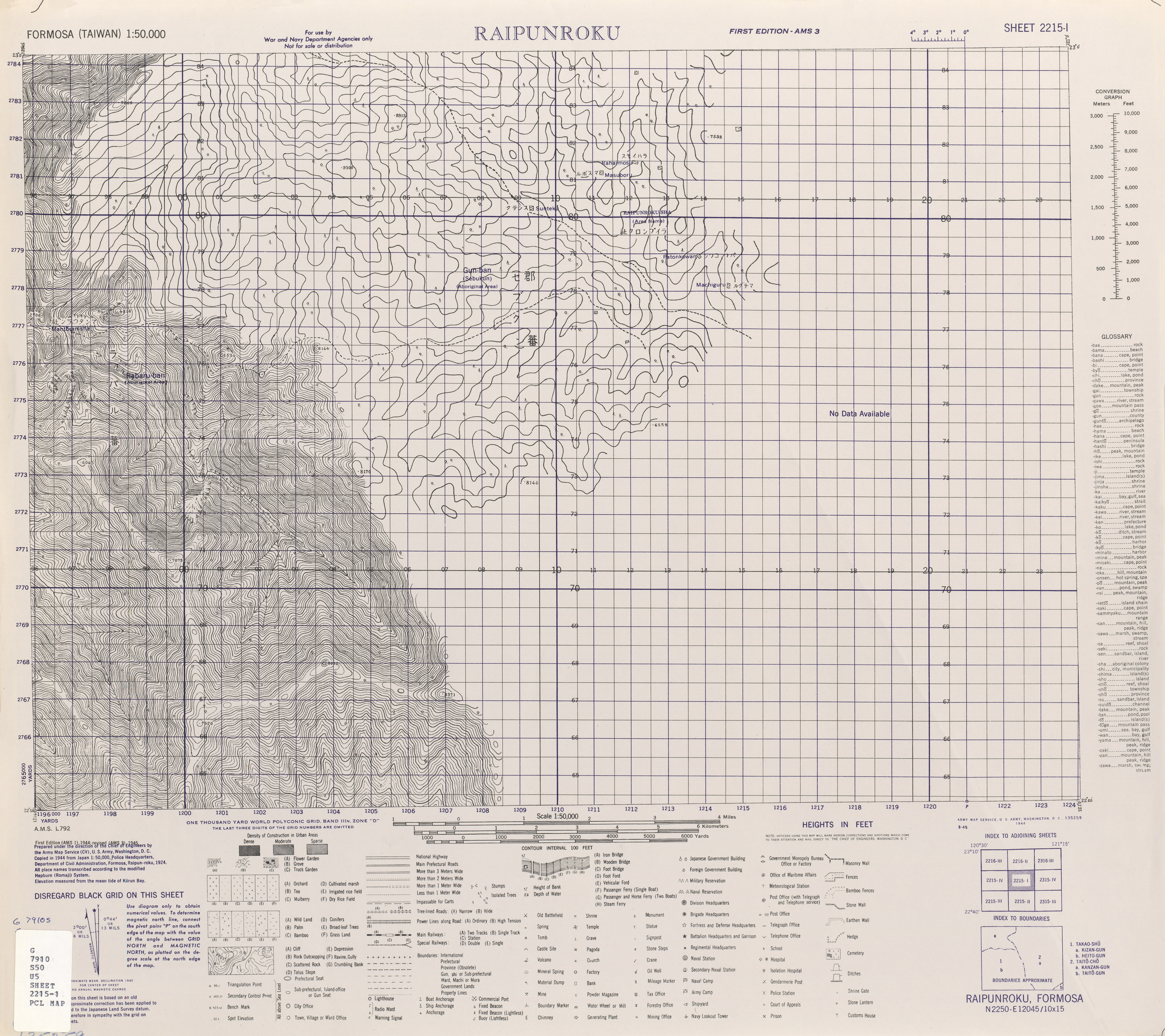
Map of eastern Maolin (1944)

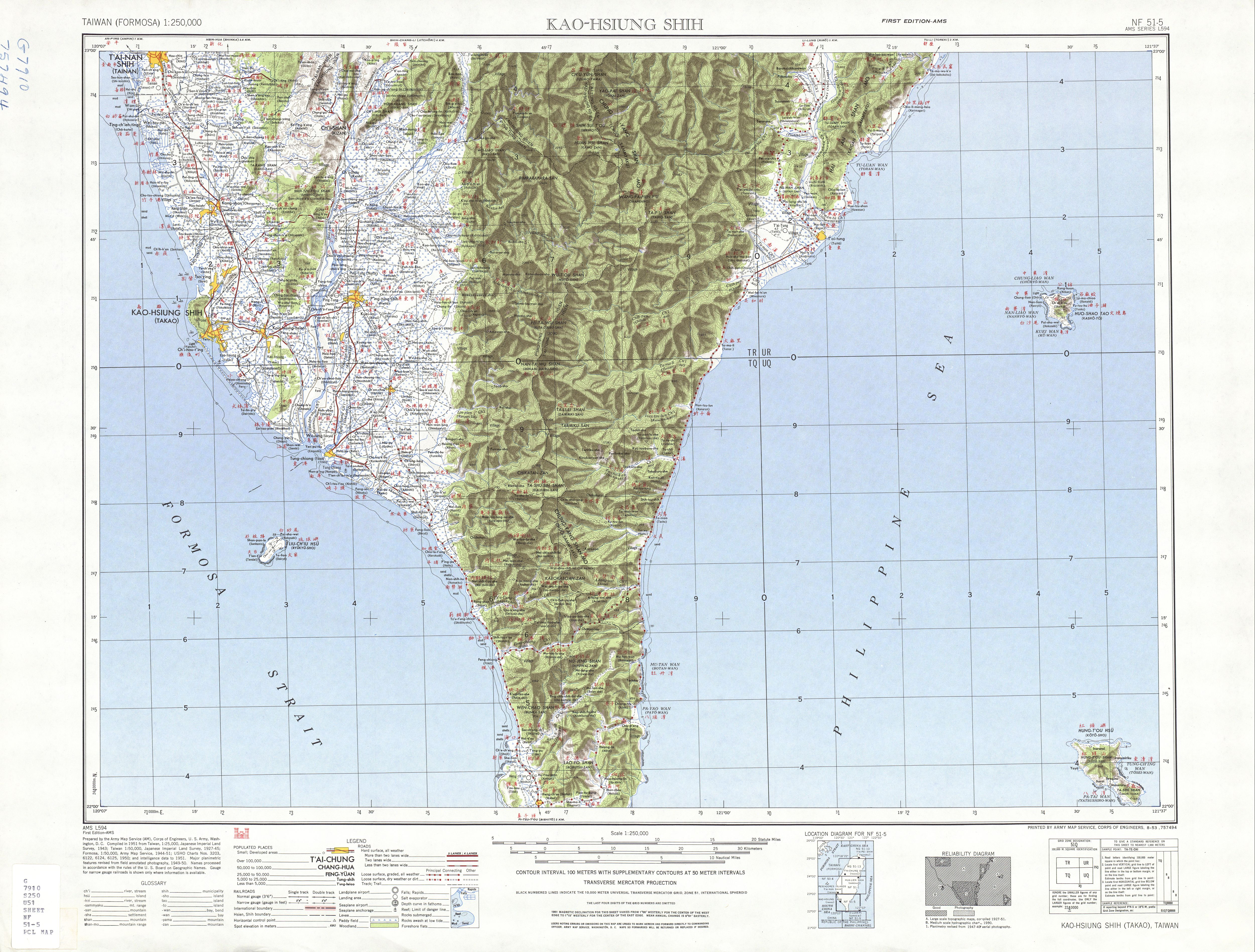
Map of region including Maolin (1951)

With a population of 1,915 as of December 2014, Maolin District has the fewest population among other districts in Kaohsiung.

- Area: 194 km^{2}
- Population: 1,900 people (October 2023)
- Postal Code: 851
- Households: 622 (October 2023)

== History ==
During the period of Japanese rule, Maolin was grouped with modern-day Namasia and Tauyuan districts and classified as "Aboriginal Areas" (蕃地), which was governed under Kizan District (旗山郡) of Takao Prefecture.

== Administrative divisions ==
Maolin District consists of 3 villages and 19 neighborhoods. Along with Namasia District, Maolin District has the fewest village among other districts in Kaohsiung.

- Duona Village (多納里)
- Maolin Village (茂林里)
- Wanshan Village (萬山里)

Miaolin District administrative divisions

== Tourist attractions ==
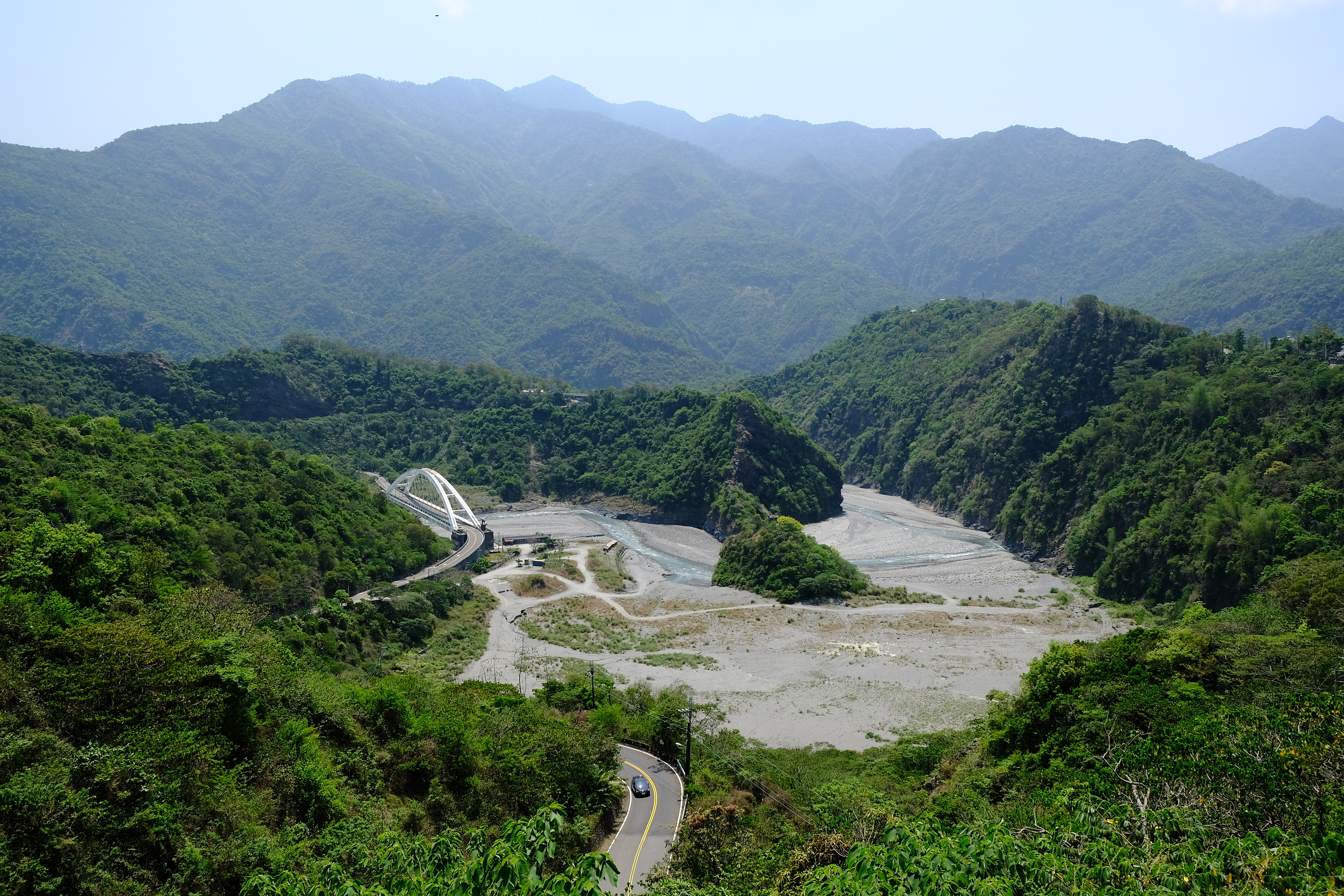
Mount Dragon Head, formed by the horseshoe bend of the Zhuokou River.

- Maolin National Scenic Area
- Duona Hot Spring
- Duona Stone Houses
- Duona Suspension Bridge
- Gorge of Serenity
- Lover's Gorge(Chinese: 情人谷)
- Maolin Gorge
- Meiya Gorge(Chinese: 美雅谷)
- Mount Dragon Head
- Mount Gueishing
- Mount Serpent Head
- Old Jiadong Tree

== Notable natives ==
- Rachel Liang, singer
- Saidai Tarovecahe, member of Legislative Yuan

== Transportation ==
- Duonagao Suspension Bridge
- Teldreka Bridge

== See also ==
- Meinong
- Pingtung
