= Dali railway station (Taiwan) =

Railway station in Yilan County, Taiwan

Dali Station 大里車站
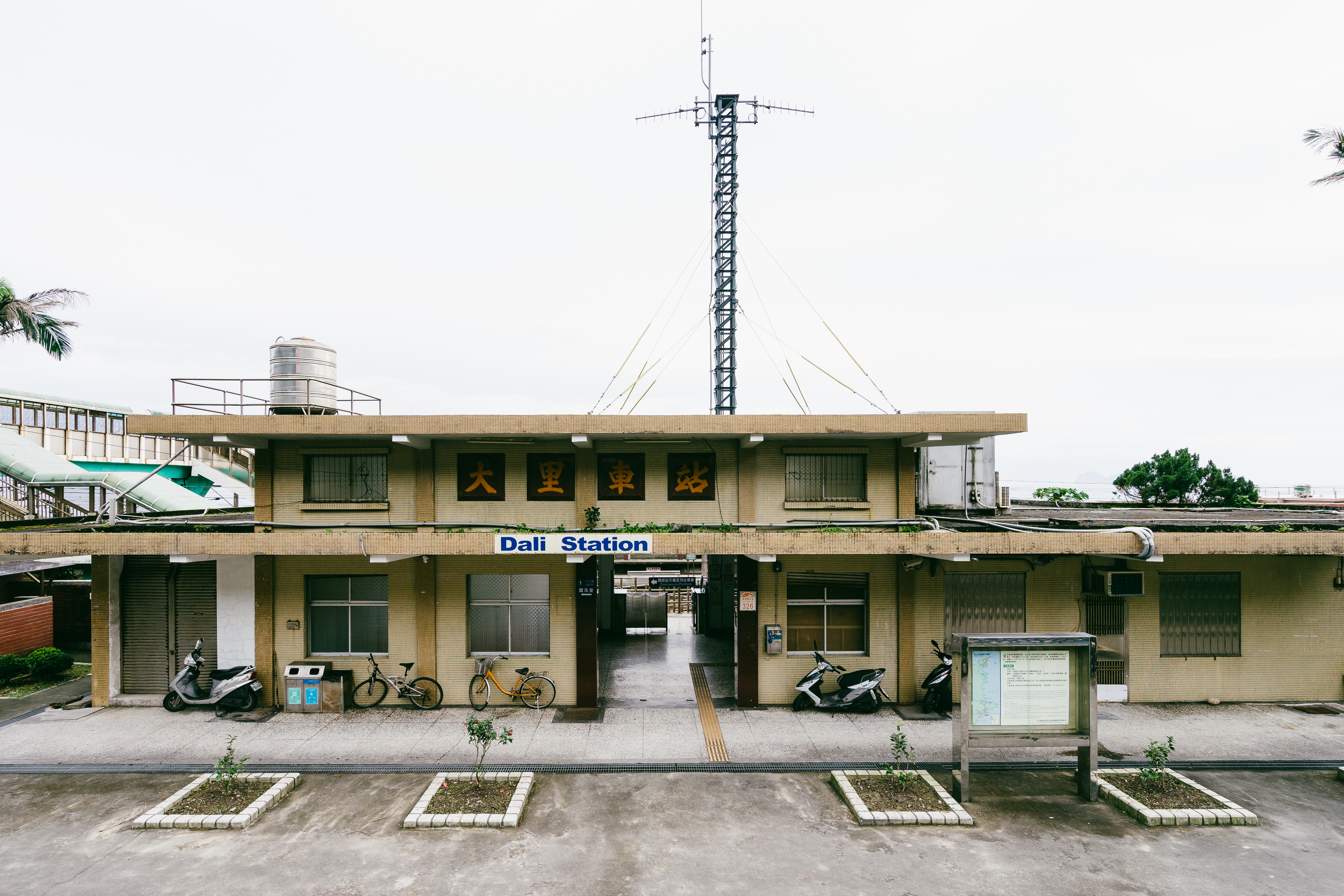

General information
- Location: Toucheng, Yilan County, Taiwan
- Coordinates: 24°58′0.5″N 121°55′21.9″E
- System: Train station
- Owner: Taiwan Railway Corporation
- Operator: Taiwan Railway Corporation
- Line: Eastern Trunk line
- Train operators: Taiwan Railway Corporation

History
- Opened: 10 December 1920

Passengers
- 1,295,466 daily (2024)

Services
Preceding station	Taiwan Railway	Following station
Shicheng towards Badu	Eastern Trunk line	Daxi towards Taitung
Location

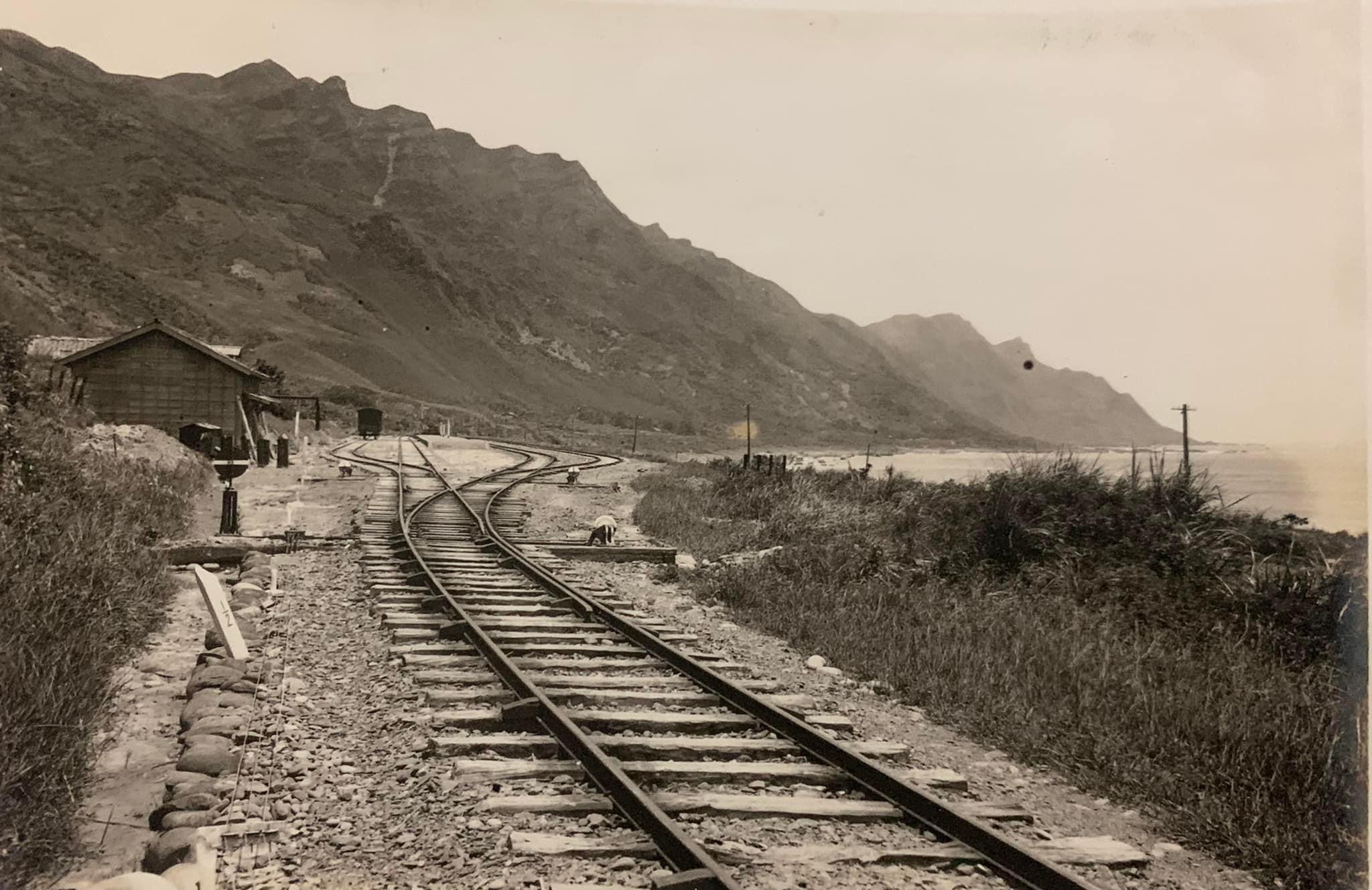
Dali Station in the 1930s

Dali (Chinese: 大里車站; pinyin: Dàlǐ Chēzhàn) is a railway station on the Taiwan Railway Yilan line located in Toucheng Township, Yilan County, Taiwan.

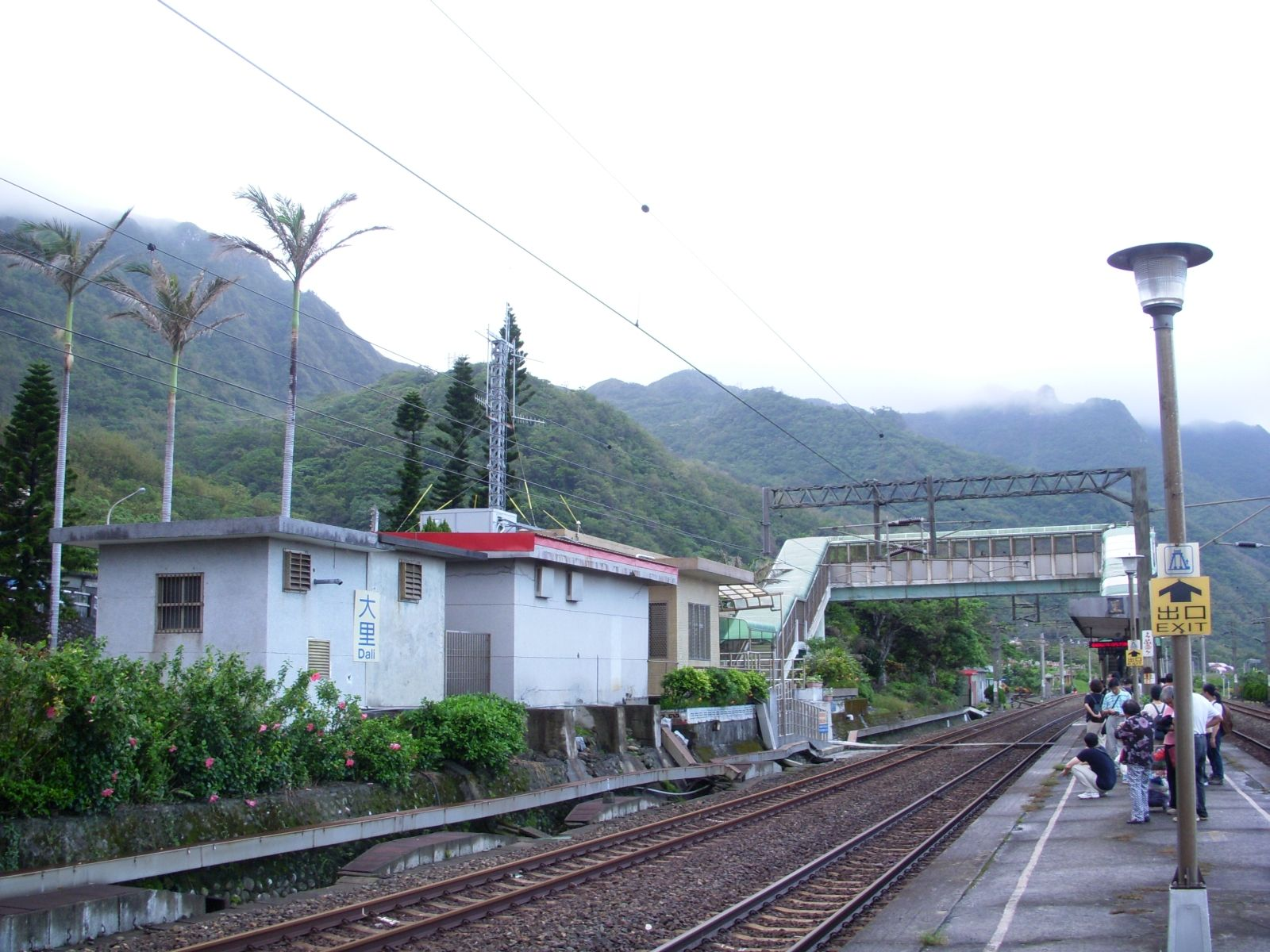
Dali station platform

== History ==
The station was opened on 10 December 1920.

== Around the station ==
- Old Dali Bridge

== See also ==
- List of railway stations in Taiwan
