= Houtanjing Sky Bridge =

Suspension bridge in Shetou, Changhua County, Taiwan

Houtanjing Sky Bridge 猴探井天空之橋
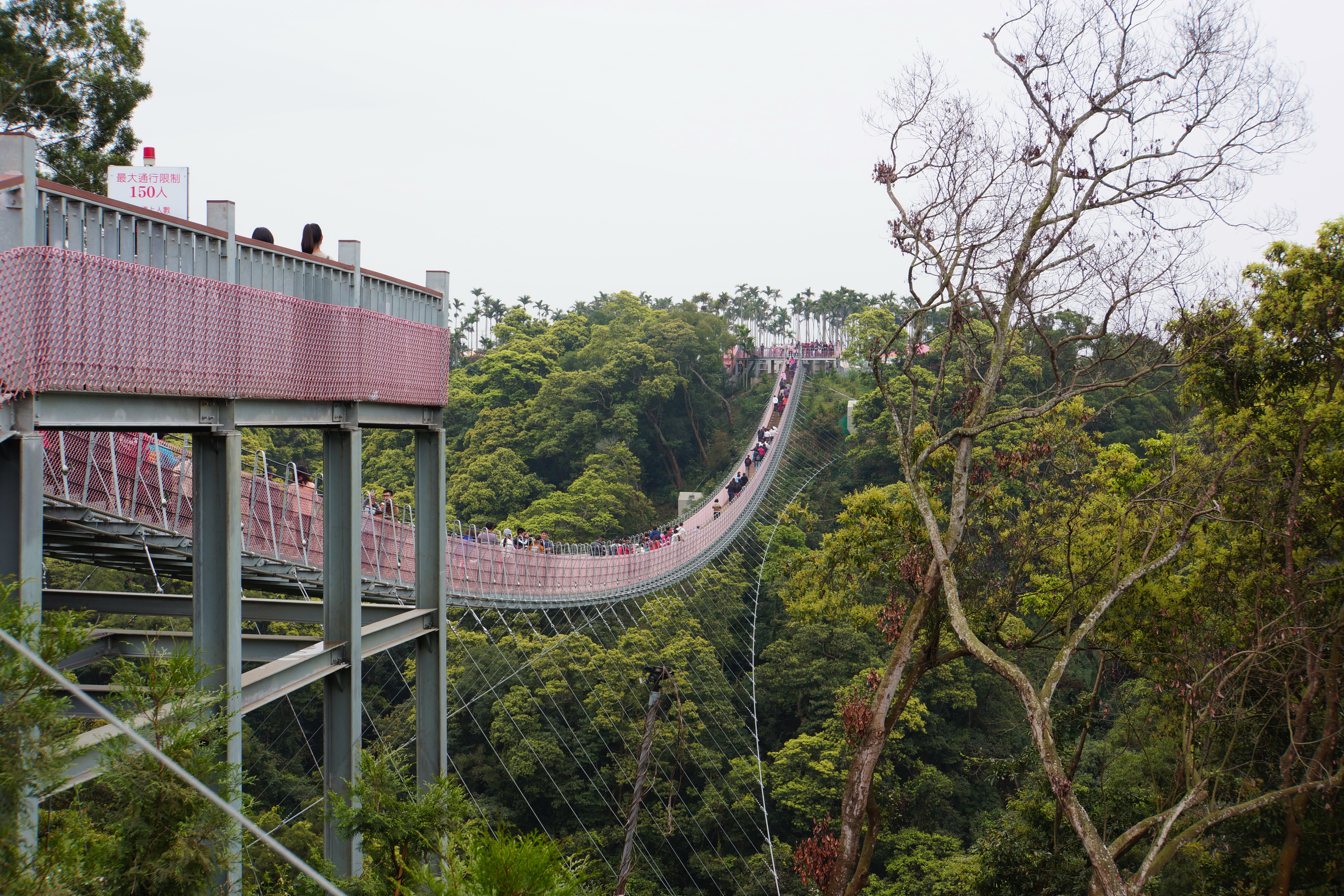
- Coordinates: 23°54′28″N 120°37′55″E
- Locale: Shetou, Changhua County in Taiwan

Characteristics
- Design: suspension bridge
- Total length: 204 m
- Clearance below: 150 m

Location
- Interactive map of Houtanjing Sky Bridge

The Houtanjing Sky Bridge (traditional Chinese: 猴探井天空之橋; simplified Chinese: 猴探井天空之桥; pinyin: Hóutànjǐng Tiānkōng Zhīqiáo) is a pedestrian suspension bridge in Shetou Township, Changhua County in Taiwan.

== Architecture ==
The bridge spans over a length of 204 meters with 265 steps. The clearance below it to the bottom of the valley is 150 meters.

== See also ==
- List of bridges in Taiwan
