= Gangkou Suspension Bridge =

Suspension bridge in Manzhou, Pingtung County, Taiwan

Gangkou Suspension Bridge 港口吊橋
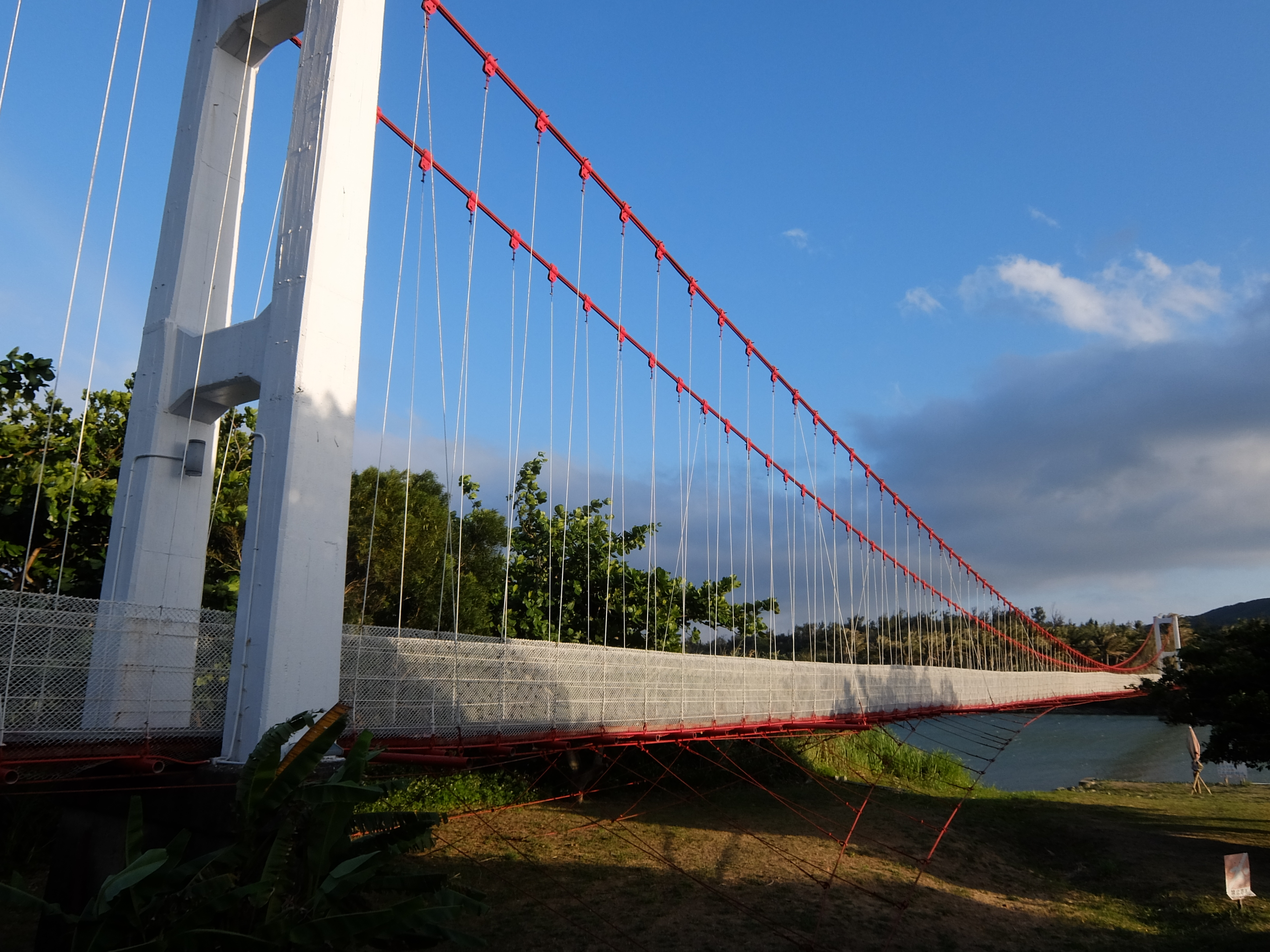
- Coordinates: 21°59′17.9″N 120°50′30.5″E
- Crosses: Gangkou River
- Locale: Manzhou, Pingtung County, Taiwan

Characteristics
- Design: suspension bridge

Location
- Interactive map of Gangkou Suspension Bridge

The Gangkou Suspension Bridge (traditional Chinese: 港口吊橋; simplified Chinese: 港口吊桥; pinyin: Gǎngkǒu Diàoqiáo) is a pedestrian suspension bridge in Manzhou Township, Pingtung County in Taiwan. It crosses the Gangkou River. The bridge has been closed since March 2022.

== Architecture ==
The bridge is painted in red and white color. It can accommodate a maximum of 60 people crossing at one time.

== See also ==
- List of bridges in Taiwan
- Transportation in Taiwan
