= Teldreka Bridge =

Bridge in Maolin, Kaohsiung, Taiwan

Teldreka Bridge 得樂日嘎大橋
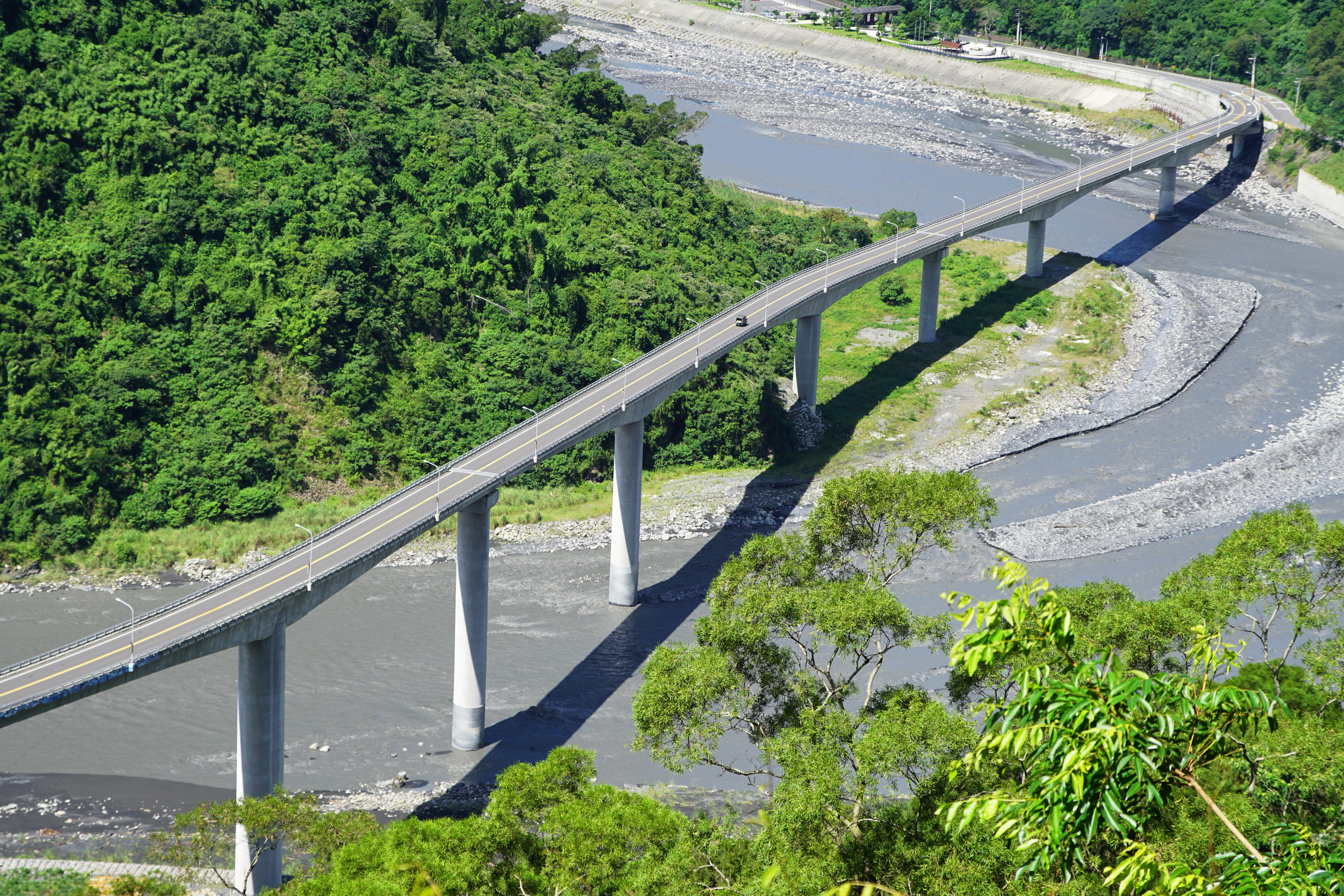
- Coordinates: 22°53′00.2″N 120°39′15.4″E
- Locale: Maolin, Kaohsiung, Taiwan

Characteristics
- Design: bridge
- Width: 10 meters
- Height: 52 meters
- Clearance below: 6.85 meters
- No. of lanes: 2

History
- Construction start: 14 December 2010
- Construction end: April 2013
- Construction cost: NT$700 million
- Opened: 20 April 2013
- Inaugurated: 11 May 2013

Location
- Interactive map of Teldreka Bridge

The Teldreka Bridge (traditional Chinese: 得樂日嘎大橋; simplified Chinese: 得乐日嘎大桥; pinyin: Délèrìgā Dàqiáo) is a bridge in Maolin District, Kaohsiung in Taiwan.

== Name ==
Teldreka is derived from Rukai language name for Maolin.

== History ==
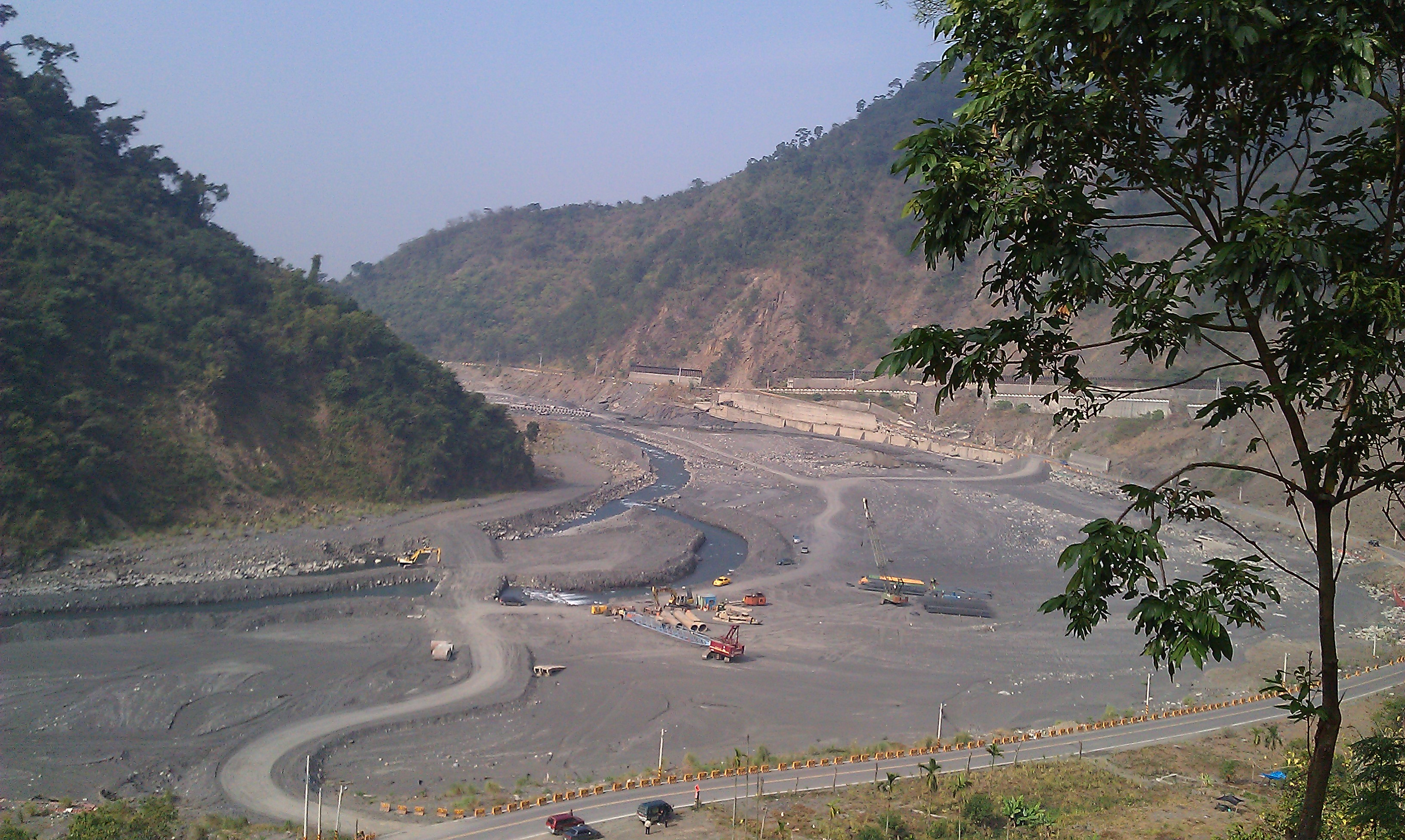
Construction of Teldreka Bridge

In August 2009, Typhoon Morakot hit Taiwan and caused the road near the entrance of Maolin National Scenic Area to collapse. Due to that incident, the Kaohsiung County Government decided to build a bridge. The construction of the whole section of the bridge started on 14 December 2010 and was completed in April 2013 with a cost of NT$700 million. The bridge was opened on 20 April 2013 and was inaugurated on 11 May 2013.

== Technical specifications ==
The bridge crosses the Zhuokou River. The section of the bridge that runs over the river is 800 metres (2,600 ft) long. It has a width of 10 metres (33 ft) and maximum height of 52 metres (171 ft) and carries two 3.5-metre (11 ft) traffic lanes. The deepest pier foundation in caisson is 38 metres (125 ft) in depth. The clearance height between the bridge girder and the river water level of a 50-year flood is 6.85 metres (22.5 ft).

== See also ==
- List of bridges in Taiwan
