= Aowanda Suspension Bridge =

Suspension bridge in Ren'ai, Nantou County, Taiwan

Aowanda Suspension Bridge 奧萬大吊橋
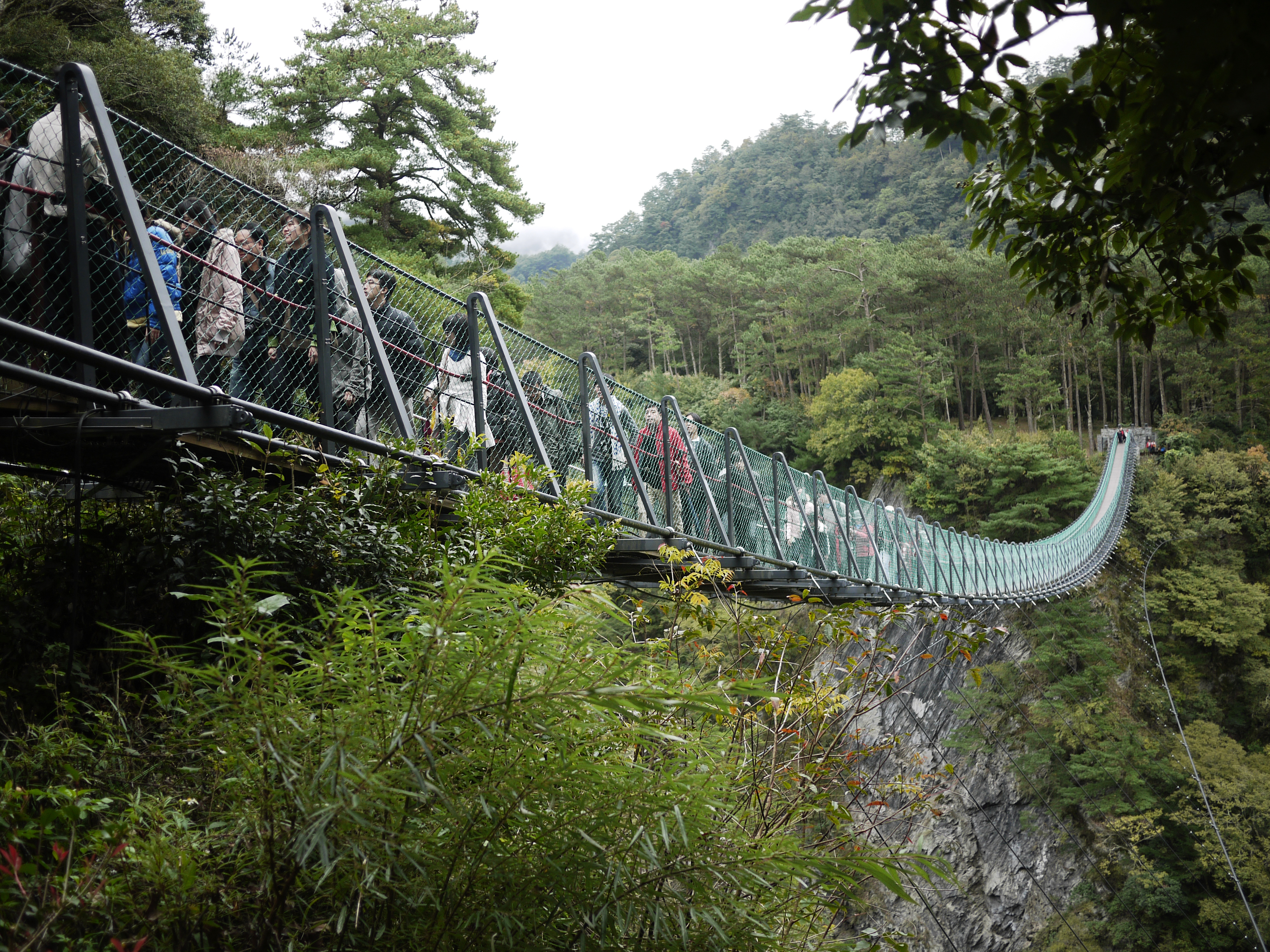
- Coordinates: 23°56′42.0″N 121°11′27.9″E
- Locale: Ren'ai, Nantou County, Taiwan

Characteristics
- Design: simple suspension bridge
- Total length: 180 meters
- Clearance below: 90 meters

Location
- Interactive map of Aowanda Suspension Bridge

The Aowanda Suspension Bridge (traditional Chinese: 奧萬大吊橋; simplified Chinese: 奥万大吊桥; pinyin: Àowàndà Diàoqiáo) is a suspension bridge in Aowanda National Forest Recreation Area, Ren'ai Township, Nantou County, Taiwan.

== Technical specifications ==
The bridge spans over a length of 180 meters with 90 meters of clearance below it. It is equipped with 1.4 meters' height of metal mesh barrier on both sides of the bridge.

== Maintenance ==
The bridge undergoes monthly maintenance by the Forestry and Nature Conservation Agency.

== See also ==
- List of bridges in Taiwan
