= Shigupan Tourist Bridge =

Bridge in Alisha, Chiayi County, Taiwan

Shigupan Tourist Bridge 石鼓盤觀光大橋
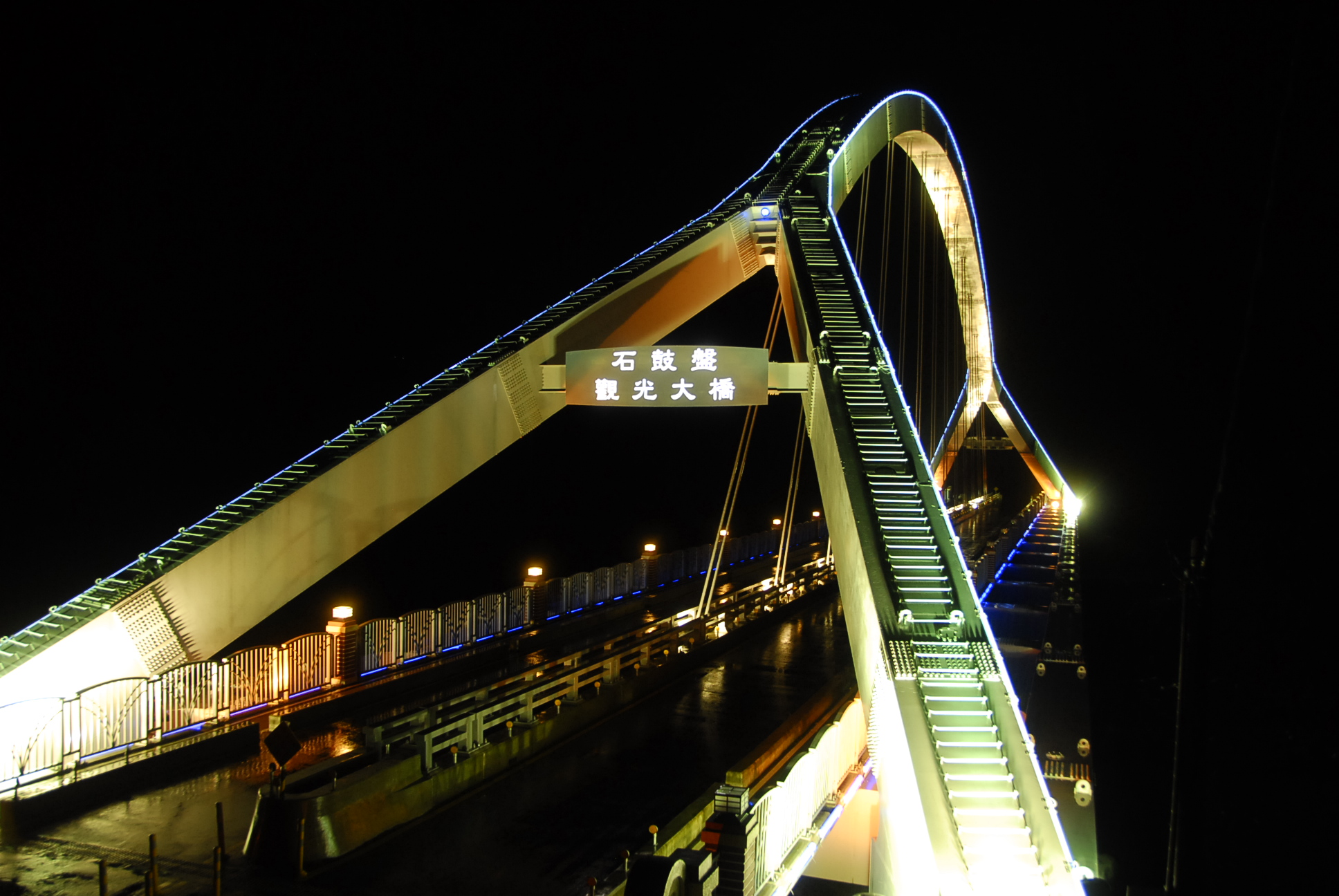
- Coordinates: 23°34′30.8″N 120°44′42.8″E
- Locale: Alishan, Chiayi County, Taiwan

Characteristics
- Design: arch bridge
- Total length: 140 meters
- Width: 7.5 meters
- No. of lanes: 2

History
- Construction end: 2007

Location
- Interactive map of Shigupan Tourist Bridge

The Shigupan Tourist Bridge (traditional Chinese: 石鼓盤觀光大橋; simplified Chinese: 石鼓盘观光大桥; pinyin: Shígǔpán Guānguāng Dàqiáo) is a bridge in Alishan Township, Chiayi County, Taiwan.

== History ==
After the 1999 Jiji earthquake cut off the area in Alishan, road infrastructures were reconstructed with a total cost of NT$170 million. The roads were eventually completed in 2007 and the Shigupan Tourist Bridge was also established soon afterwards.

== Technical specification ==
The bridge is a single steel tied-arch bridge which spans over a length of 140 meters and a width of 7.5 meters. The bridge has the longest span in the county. It has 2 lanes and 2 sidewalks each on its side. It features color-changing lights where they are lit up during evening time.

== See also ==
- List of bridges in Taiwan
