= Kentington Resort =

Resort in Manzhou, Pingtung County, Taiwan

- 小墾丁渡假村
- Interactive map of the Kentington Resort area

General information
- Type: resort
- Location: Manzhou, Pingtung County, Taiwan
- Coordinates: 22°01′36″N 120°50′10″E

Technical details
- Floor area: 40 hectares

Website
- Official website (in Chinese)

The Kentington Resort (traditional Chinese: 小墾丁渡假村; simplified Chinese: 小垦丁渡假村; pinyin: Xiǎo Kěndīng Dùjiàcūn) is a tourist attraction resort in Manzhou Township, Pingtung County, Taiwan.

== Architecture ==
In a 40 hectares area, the resort has 309 huts, dining areas, recreational areas and venues for conferences or banquets.

== Transportation ==
The resort is accessible by bus from Fangliao Station or Kaohsiung Station of Taiwan Railway to Hengchun transfer station, in which Kentington Resort buses can arrange for pickups from the transfer station.

== See also ==
- List of tourist attractions in Taiwan
