= Fumei Suspension Bridge =

Suspension bridge in Alishan, Chiayi County, Taiwan

Fumei Suspension Bridge 福美吊橋
- Coordinates: 23°22′36″N 120°40′28″E
- Locale: Alishan, Chiayi County, Taiwan

Characteristics
- Design: suspension bridge
- Total length: 175 meters
- Clearance below: 80 meters

Location
- Interactive map of Fumei Suspension Bridge

The Fumei Suspension Bridge (traditional Chinese: 福美吊橋; simplified Chinese: 福美吊桥; pinyin: Fúměi Diàoqiáo) is a bridge in Shanmei Village, Alishan Township, Chiayi County, Taiwan.

== History ==
The bridge was donated by the Fujian chapter of Red Cross Society of China.

== Architecture ==
The bridge is decorated with red, blue and black of the indigenous painting of Tsou people. There is a pavilion at one end of the bridge featuring a mosaic decoration which was inspired from a myth.

== Technical specifications ==
The bridge spans over a length of 175 meters and hanging 80 meters above the river.

== See also ==
- List of bridges in Taiwan
