= Aowanda National Forest Recreation Area =

Forest in Rein'ai, Nantou County, Taiwan

Aowanda National Forest Recreation Area Chinese: 奧萬大國家森林遊樂區
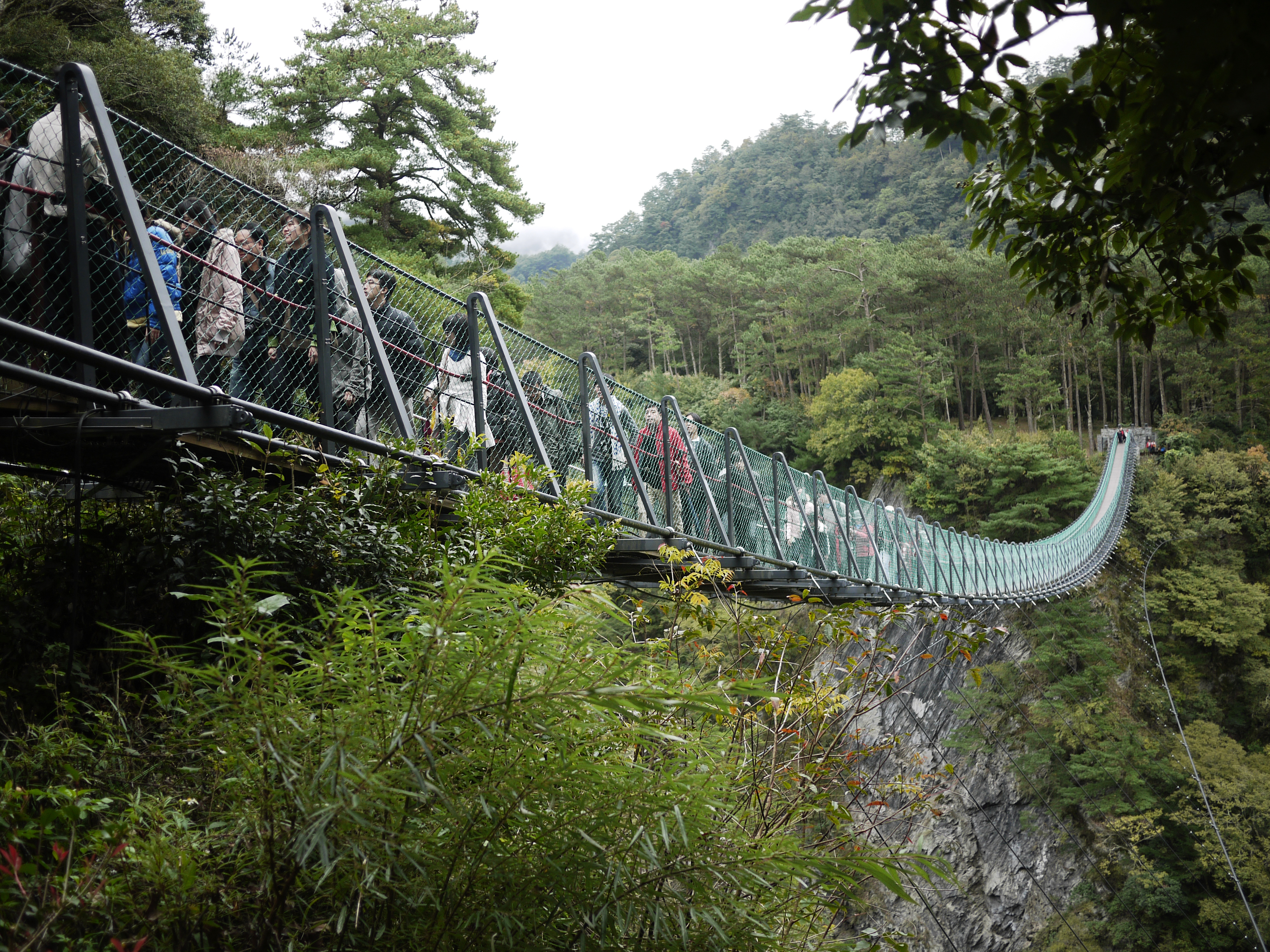

- Location within Nantou County
- Interactive map of Aowanda National Forest Recreation Area

Geography
- Location: Ren'ai, Nantou County, Taiwan
- Coordinates: 23°57′14.3″N 121°10′36.4″E
- Elevation: 1,100–2,600 m (3,600–8,500 ft)
- Area: 2,787 ha (6,890 acres)

Aowanda National Forest Recreation Area (traditional Chinese: 奧萬大國家森林遊樂區; simplified Chinese: 奥万大国家森林游乐区; pinyin: Àowàndà Guójiā Sēnlín Yóulè Qū) is a forest located in Ren'ai Township, Nantou County, Taiwan.

== Geology ==
The forest spans over an area of 2,787 hectares at an altitude of 1,100-2,600 meters. It is divided into the waterfall zone, forest park, maple area and pine tree site. It is located at the back of Wanda Reservoir. It is home to more than 200 species of birds.

== Facilities ==
The forest features a visitor center, bird watching platform and benches. Bridge in the forest is Aowanda Suspension Bridge.

== Transportation ==
The forest is accessible by bus from Taichung TRA Station or Taichung HSR Station through Provincial Highway 14.

== See also ==
- Geography of Taiwan
