= Meishan Park =

Park in Meishan, Chiayi County, Taiwan

- 梅山公園
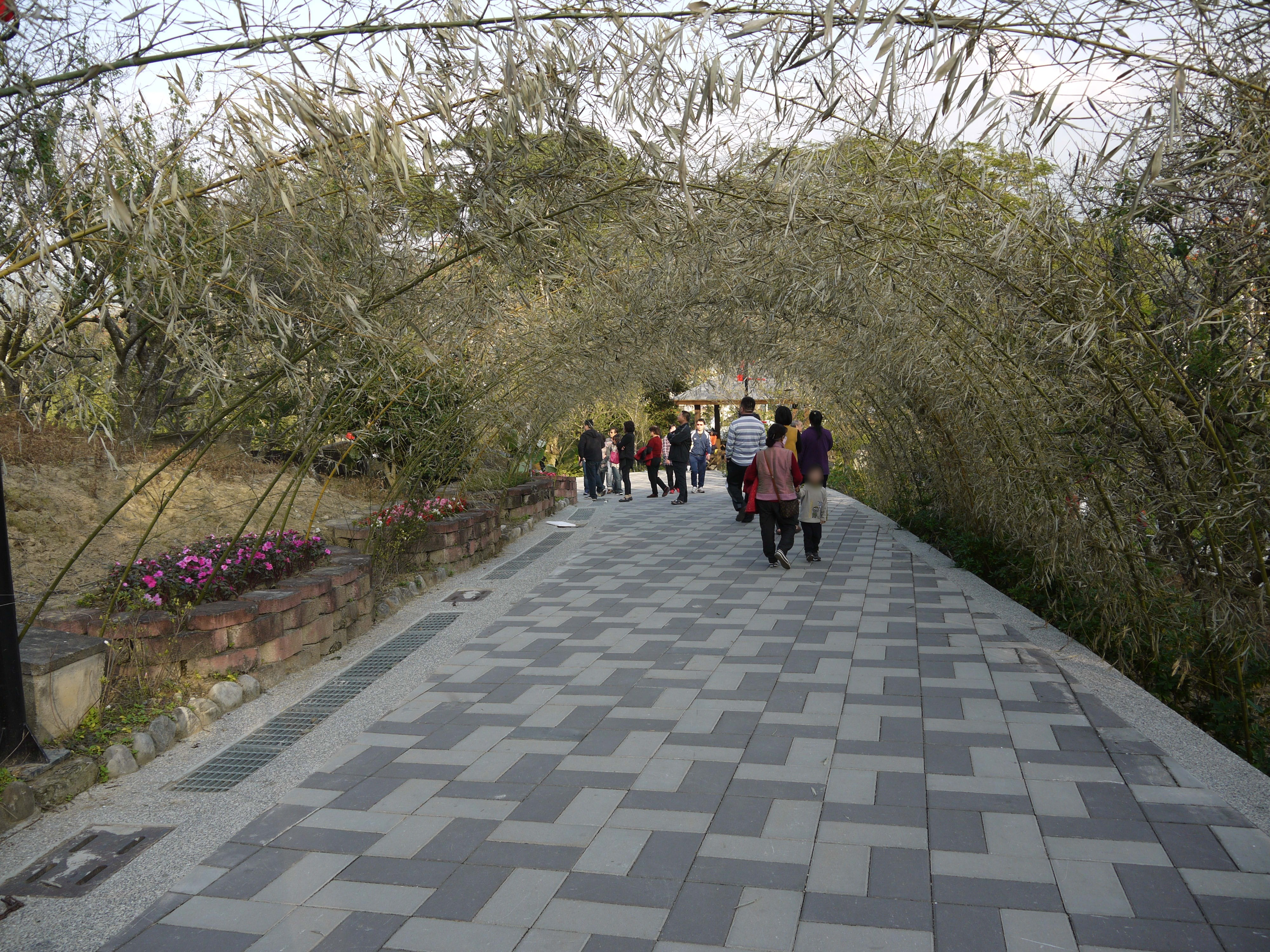
- Interactive map of Meishan Park
- Type: park
- Location: Meishan, Chiayi County, Taiwan
- Coordinates: 23°34′42.4″N 120°33′29.1″E
- Area: 6 hectares (15 acres)

The Meishan Park (traditional Chinese: 梅山公園; simplified Chinese: 梅山公园; pinyin: Méishān Gōngyuán) is a park in Meishan Township, Chiayi County, Taiwan.

== Geology ==
The park spans over an area of 6 hectares consisting of around 3,000 trees.

== Facilities ==
The park is equipped with the sky corridor walking paths and tree house platform.

== Transportation ==
The park is accessible by bus from Chiayi Station of Taiwan Railway.

== See also ==
- List of parks in Taiwan
