= Old Dali Bridge =

Bridge in Toucheng, Yilan County, Taiwan

Old Dali Bridge 舊大里橋
- Coordinates: 24°57′49.3″N 121°55′13.2″E
- Locale: Toucheng, Yilan County, Taiwan

Characteristics
- Design: arch bridge
- Material: Stone

History
- Rebuilt: 1941
- Closed: 1979
- Replaced by: New Dali Bridge

Location
- Interactive map of Old Dali Bridge

The Old Dali Bridge (traditional Chinese: 舊大里橋; simplified Chinese: 旧大里桥; pinyin: Jiù Dàlǐ Qiáo) is a former bridge in Toucheng Township, Yilan County, Taiwan.

== History ==
During the Japanese rule of Taiwan, roads connecting Keelung and Yilan City in Taihoku Prefecture were constructed to consolidate the Japanese power on the island. A stone bridge was constructed from its former shape from wood and widened in 1941. In February 1979, the new Dali Bridge was completed and connected to the Provincial Highway 2. Subsequently, the old Dali Bridge was no longer used.

In December 27, 2002, the bridge is officially recognized as a county monument by the Yilan County.

== Architecture ==
The bridge is a single-arched structure made from stone. Steel was not used due to its restriction during World War II.

== Transportation ==
The bridge is accessible within walking distance south of Dali Station of Taiwan Railway.

== See also ==
- List of bridges in Taiwan
- Transportation in Taiwan
