= Taiping Sky Bridge =

Suspension bridge in Meishan, Chiayi County, Taiwan

Taiping Sky Bridge 太平雲梯
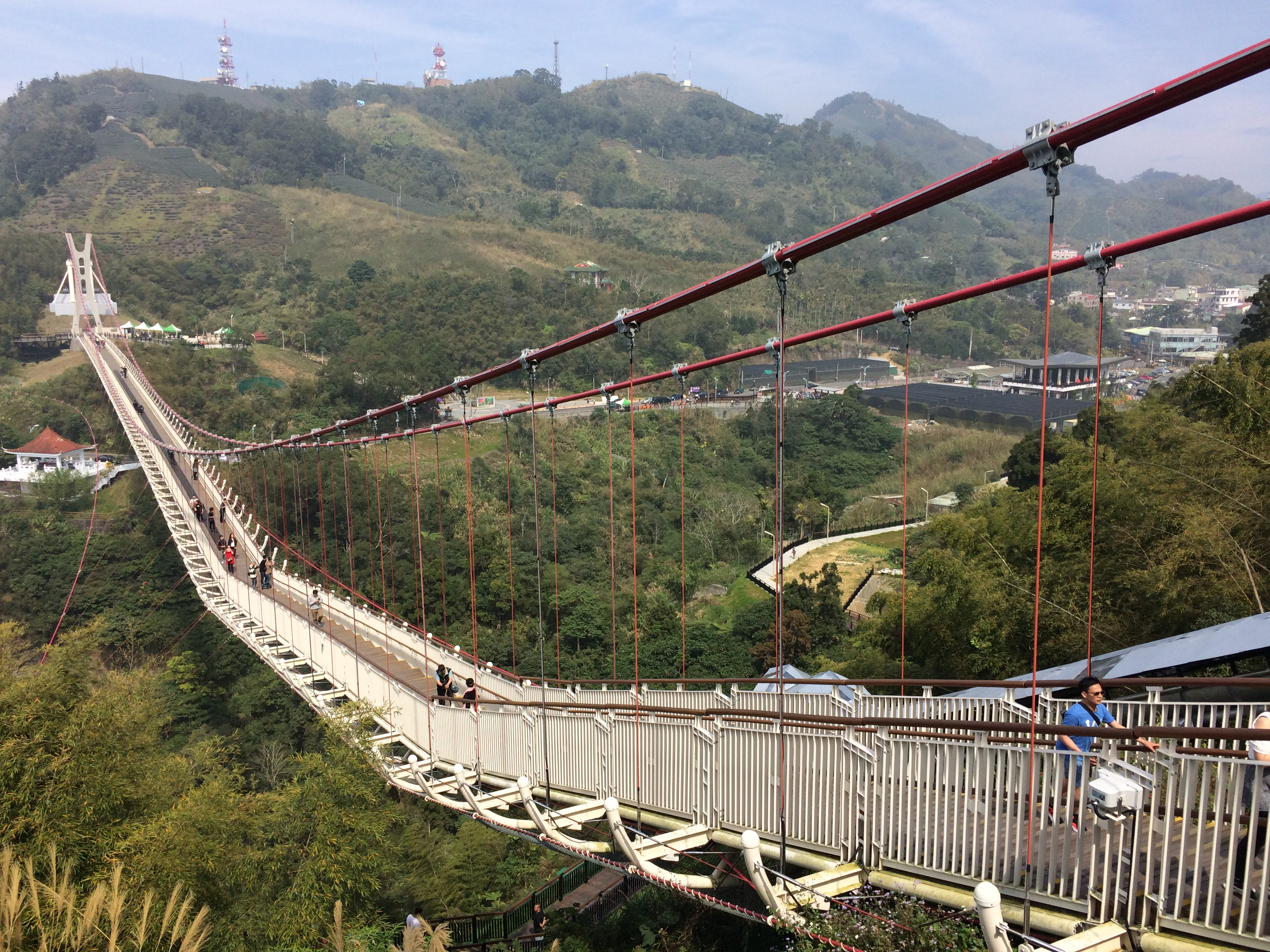
- Coordinates: 23.5599°N 120.5978°E
- Locale: Meishan, Chiayi County, Taiwan

Characteristics
- Design: suspension bridge
- Total length: 281 m
- Height: 1,000 m

History
- Opened: 23 September 2017; 8 years ago
- Inaugurated: 20 August 2017; 8 years ago

Location
- Interactive map of Taiping Sky Bridge

The Taiping Sky Bridge (traditional Chinese: 太平雲梯; simplified Chinese: 太平云梯; pinyin: Tàipíng Yúntī) is a suspension bridge in Meishan Township, Chiayi County, Taiwan. It is the longest suspension bridge in Taiwan.

== History ==
The bridge was inaugurated on 20 August 2017 in a ceremony attended by Chiayi Magistrate Helen Chang. It then opened on 23 September that year.

== Architecture ==
The bridge spans over a length of 281 meters with a height of about 1,000 meters above sea level. The bridge is decorated with lamps which are lighted up differently every evening following the colors of the rainbow.

== See also ==
- List of bridges in Taiwan
- Transportation in Taiwan
