= Rainbow Arch Bridge =

Rainbow Arch Bridge may refer to:

- Rainbow Arch Bridge (Valley City, North Dakota), a Marsh Rainbow Arch structure that was built in 1925
- Rainbow Arch Bridge (Fort Morgan, Colorado), a National Register of Historic Places listing in Morgan County, Colorado

== See also ==
- Rainbow Bridge (disambiguation)
