= Mount Nanren Ecological Reserve Area =

Nature reserve in Manzhou, Pingtung County, Taiwan

Mount Nanren Ecological Reserve Area Chinese: 南仁山生態保護區
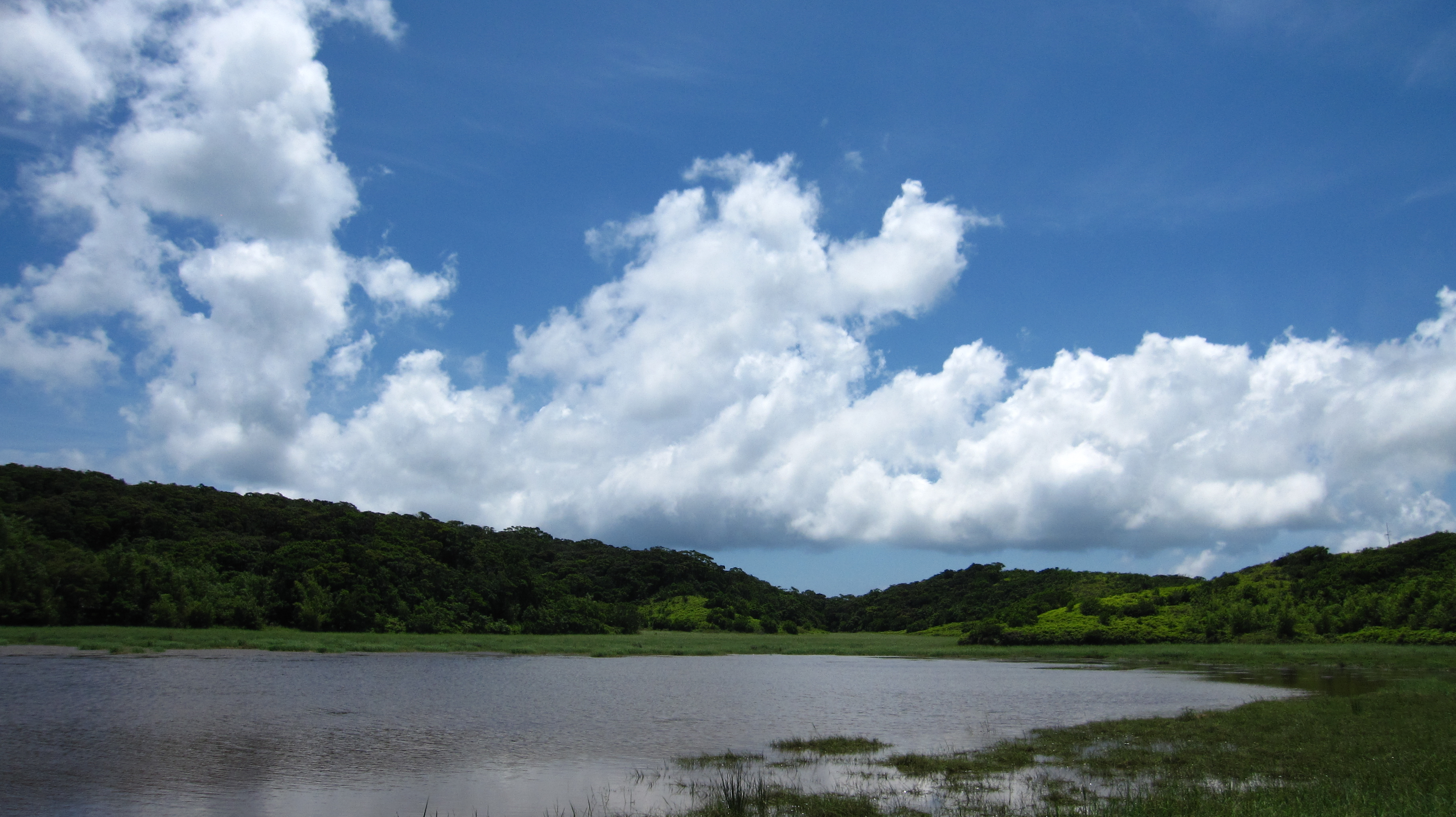

- Location within Pingtung County
- Interactive map of Mount Nanren Ecological Reserve Area

Geography
- Location: Manzhou, Pingtung County, Taiwan
- Coordinates: 22°05′14.8″N 120°51′13.0″E
- Area: 5,800 ha (14,000 acres)

Administration
- Established: 1995

Mount Nanren Ecological Reserve Area (traditional Chinese: 南仁山生態保護區; simplified Chinese: 南仁山生态保护区; pinyin: Nánrén Shān Shēngtài Bǎohùqū) is a nature reserve in Kenting National Park, Manzhou Township, Pingtung County, Taiwan.

== History ==
The reserve was established in 1995. The reserve was closed from May until end of 2008.

== Geology ==
The reserve spans over an area of 5,800 hectares. It features three lakes, which are the main water body, Nanren Lake and Yilan Lake.

== See also ==
- Geography of Taiwan
