= Meishan, Chiayi =

Rural township in Chiayi County, Taiwan

Coordinates: 23°33′38.7″N 120°37′46.6″E

Meishan Township 梅山鄉 Koume
- Rural township
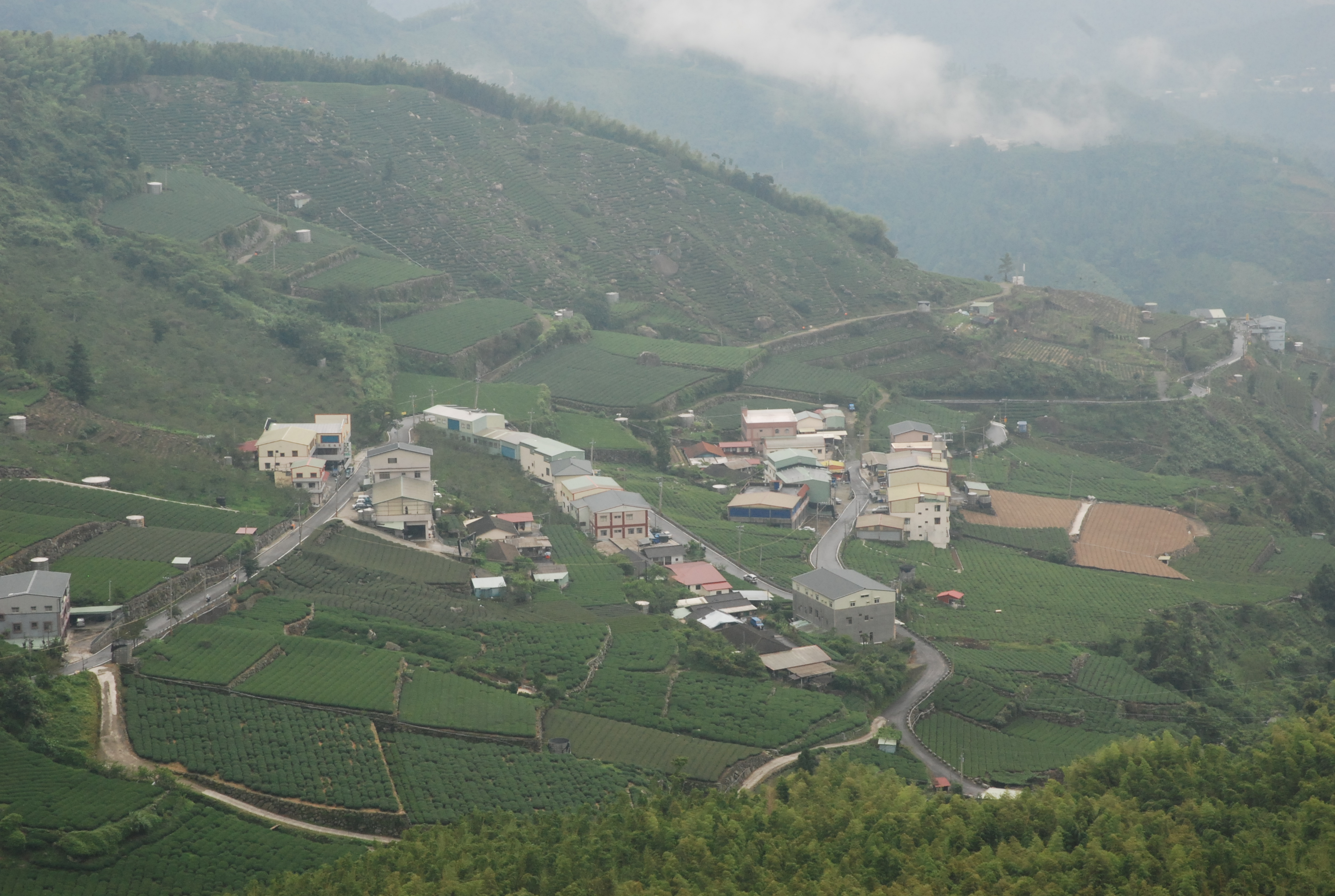

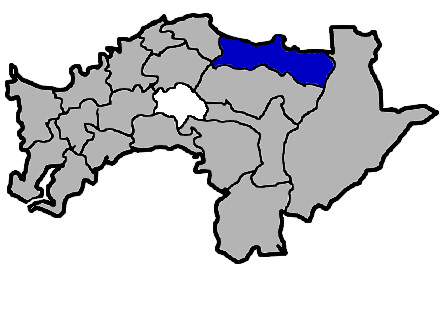
- Meishan Township in Chiayi County
- Location: Chiayi County, Taiwan

Area
  - Total: 120 km^{2} (46 sq mi)

Population (May 2022)
  - Total: 18,164
  - Density: 150/km^{2} (390/sq mi)

Meishan Township (Chinese: 梅山鄉; pinyin: Méishān Xiāng) is a rural township in Chiayi County, Taiwan. It is located in the northeastern part of the county, bordering Yunlin County.

== Geography ==
It has a population total of 18,164 and an area of 119.7571 km^{2}.

== Administrative divisions ==
Meitung, Meinan, Meibei, Guoshan, Zunnan, Zunbei, Shuangxi, Danan, Anjing, Yongxing, Bantian, Taiping, Taixing, Longyan, Bihu, Ruifeng, Ruili and Taihe Village.

== Tourist attractions ==
- Meishan Park
- Taiping Sky Bridge
- Yuntan Waterfall
- Taiping (太平) Scenic Area
- Rueifong (瑞峰) Scenic Area
- Taihe (太和) Scenic Area
- Rueili (瑞里) Scenic Area
- Shuangsi (雙溪) Grand Canyon
- Bihu (碧湖) Farms Leisure park

== Transportation ==
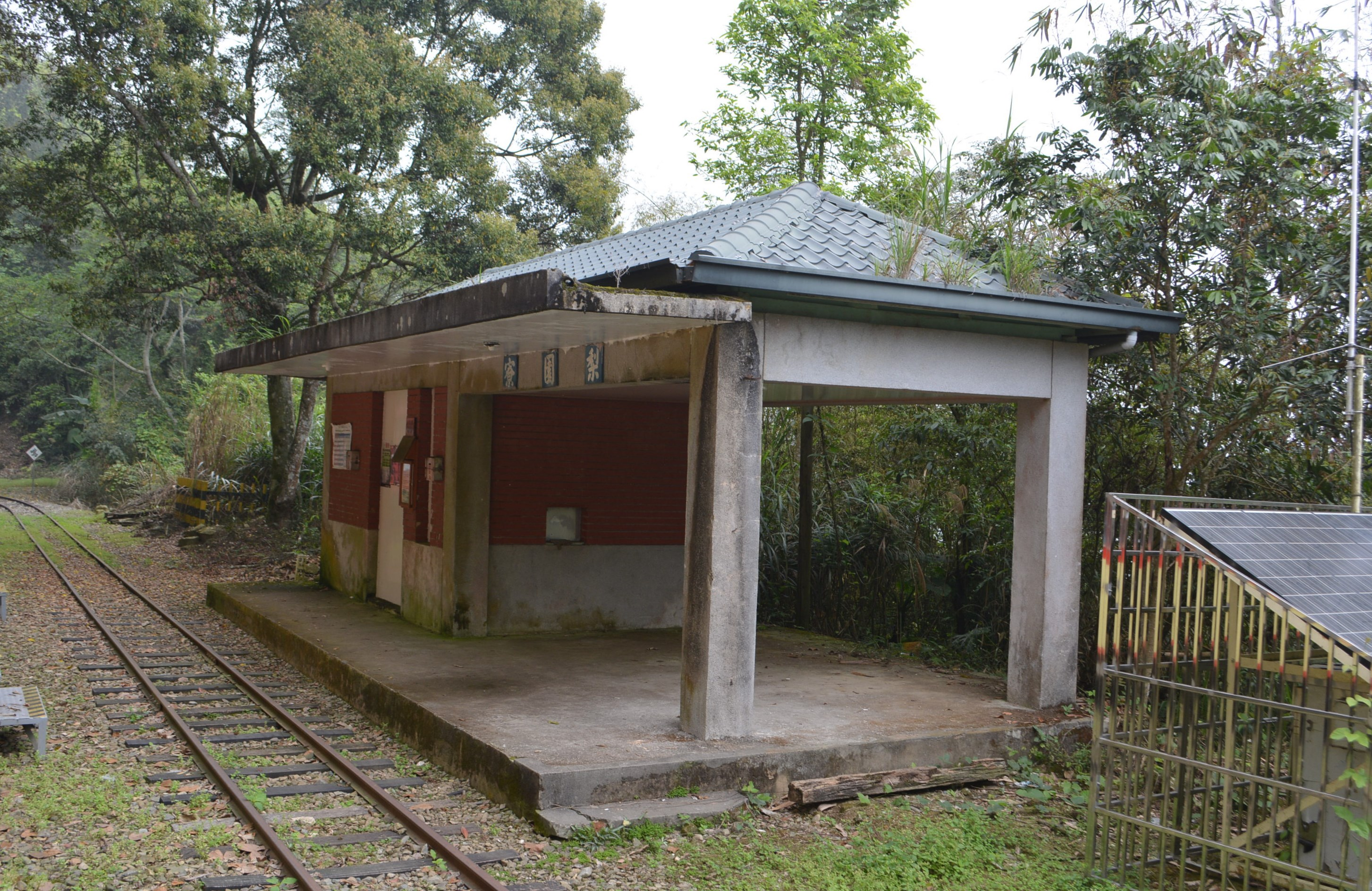
Liyuanliao Station

- County Road 149
- County Road 162
- County Road 162甲
- County Road 169

=== Alishan Forest Railway ===
- Liyuanliao Station
