= Manzhou, Pingtung =

Rural township in Pingtung County, Taiwan

Coordinates: 22.044277°N 120.846809°E

Manzhou Township 滿州鄉 (Manjhou)
- Rural township
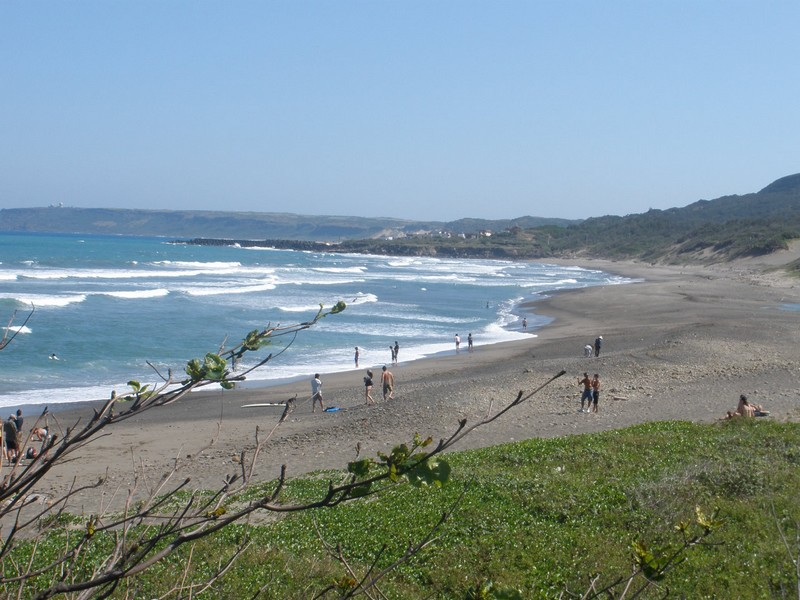
- Beach at Jialeshui in Manzhou Township

- Manzhou Township in Pingtung County
- Location: Pingtung County, Taiwan

Area
  - Total: 142 km^{2} (55 sq mi)

Population (February 2024)
  - Total: 7,196
  - Density: 50.7/km^{2} (131/sq mi)

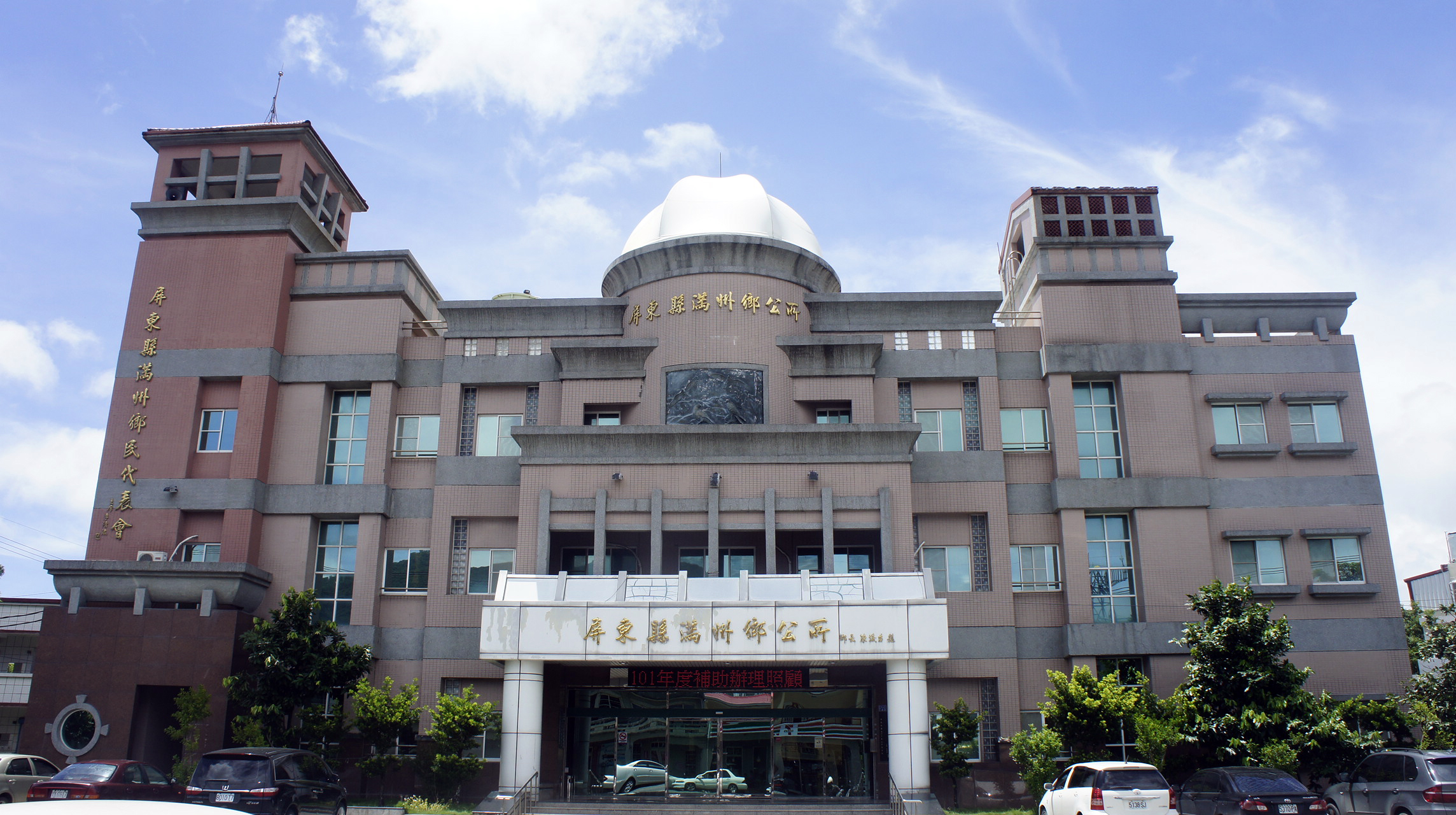
Manzhou Township Office

Manzhou Township (Chinese: 滿州鄉; pinyin: Mǎnzhōu Xiāng, Paiwan: Vangecul) is a rural township in Pingtung County, Taiwan.

It has an area of 142.2 square kilometers (54.9 sq mi) and a population of 7,196. The indigenous Paiwan people makes up 25% of the population.

== Geography ==
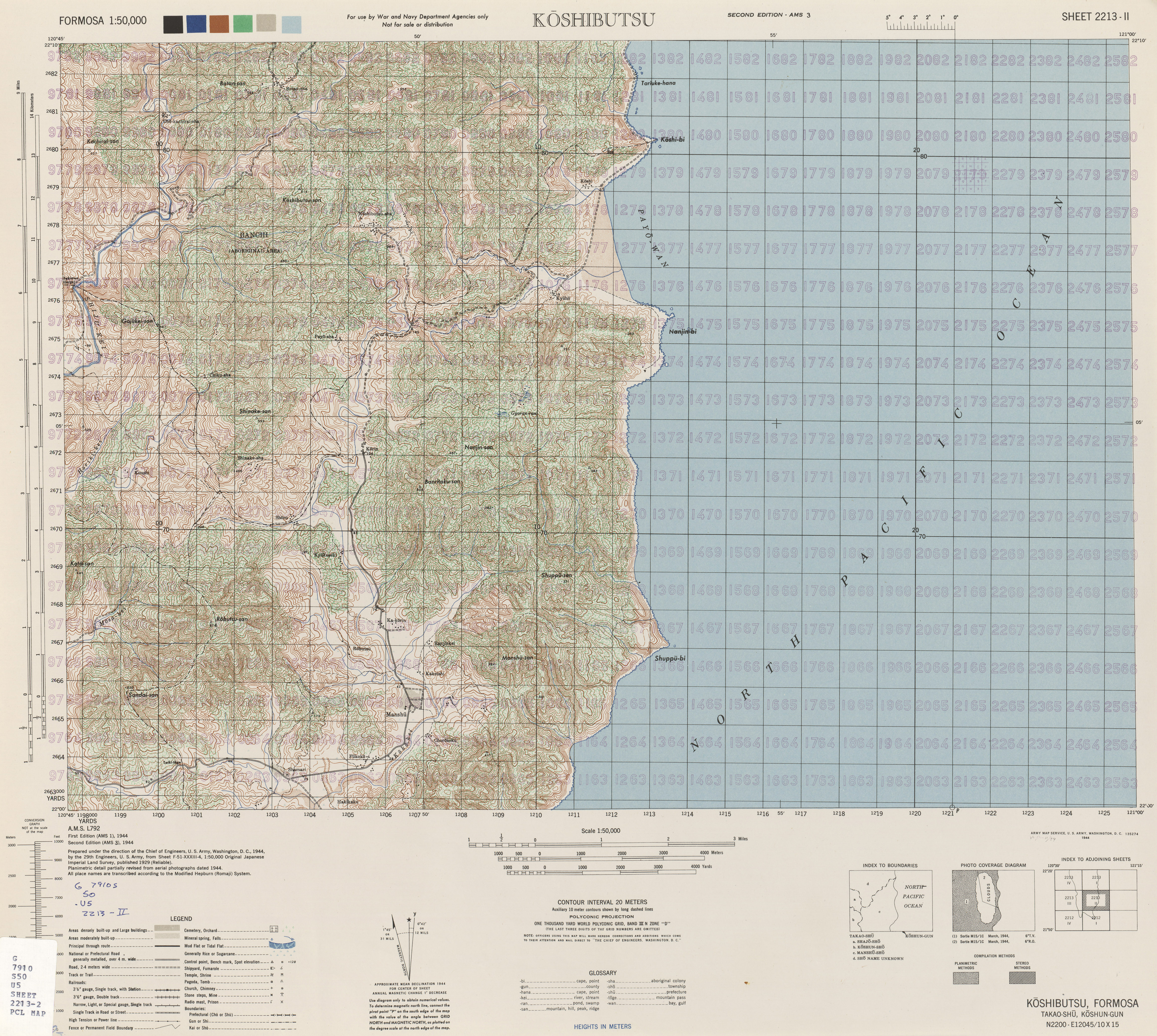

Manzhou is bordered to the southwest by Hengchun, to the west by Checheng and to the northwest by Mudan.

== Administrative divisions ==
The township comprises eight villages: Gangkou, Gangzi, Jiupeng, Lide, Manzhou, Xianglin, Yongjing and Zhangle.

== Economy ==
In 2025 the Taiwan Space Agency (TASA) announced its selection of Manzhou as location of the National Launch Site. The decision came down to Manzhou and Dajen township in Taitung County. Within Manzhou township the site would be located in Jiupeng village.

== Tourist attractions ==
- Cikong Waterfalls
- Gangkou Suspension Bridge
- Jioupeng Sand Dunes
- Kentington Resort
- Mount Nanren Ecological Reserve Area

== See also ==
- Jiupeng Military Base
