= List of bridges in Taiwan =

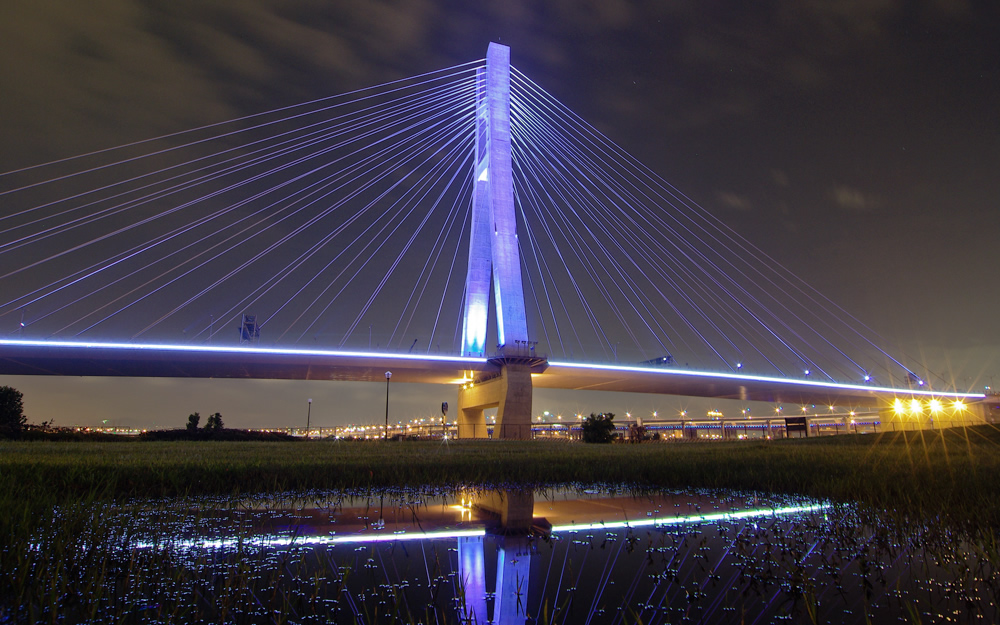
New Taipei Bridge

As of October 2019, there are 29,811 bridges in Taiwan.

== List ==
This is a list of bridges in Taiwan.

- Aowanda Suspension Bridge
- Beigang Tourist Bridge
- Changhua–Kaohsiung Viaduct
- Danjiang Bridge
- Daxi Bridge
- Dijiu Suspension Bridge
- Duonagao Suspension Bridge
- Fumei Suspension Bridge
- Fuxing Suspension Bridge
- Gangkou Suspension Bridge
- Great Harbor Bridge
- Guandu Bridge
- Guchuan Bridge
- Houtanjing Sky Bridge
- Jiaxian Bridge
- Jinde Bridge
- Jinlun Bridge
- Kao-Ping Hsi Bridge
- Kinmen Bridge
- Ligang Bridge
- Longteng Bridge
- Luofu Bridge
- Nanfang'ao Bridge
- New Taipei Bridge
- Nuomi Bridge
- Old Dali Bridge
- Old Donghe Bridge
- Penghu Great Bridge
- Rainbow Bridge (Taipei)
- Shigupan Tourist Bridge
- Shuiyuan Suspension Bridge
- Tamsui Lover's Bridge
- Taipei Bridge
- Taiping Sky Bridge
- Teldreka Bridge
- Xikou Suspension Bridge
- Xiluo Bridge
- Xindong Bridge
- Xiwei Bridge

== See also ==
- List of roads in Taiwan
