= Duonagao Suspension Bridge =

Suspension bridge in Maolin, Kaohsiung, Taiwan

Duonagao Suspension Bridge 多納高吊橋
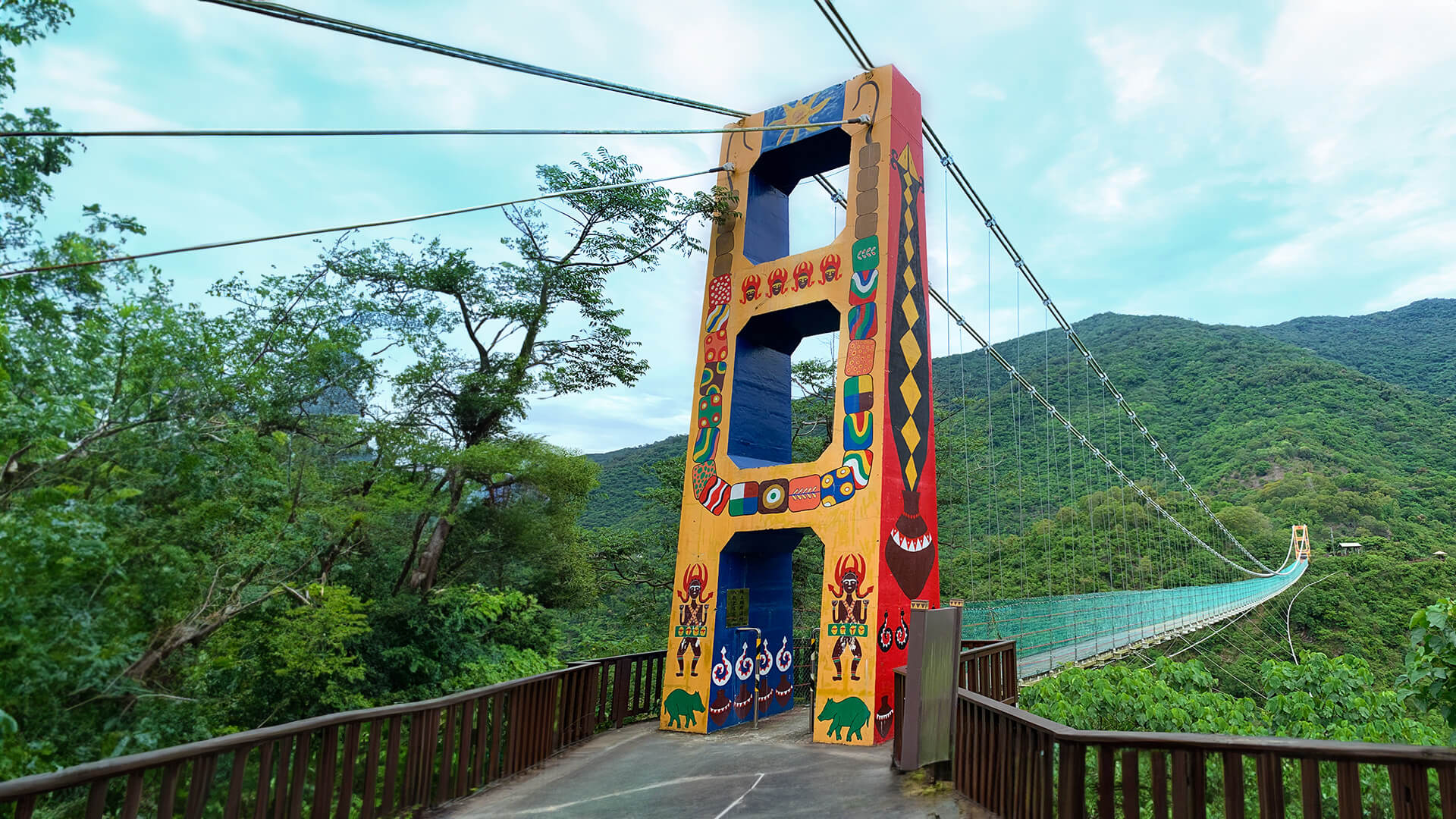
- Coordinates: 22°54′51.0″N 120°41′21.2″E
- Crosses: Zhuokou River
- Locale: Maolin, Kaohsiung, Taiwan

Characteristics
- Design: suspension bridge
- Total length: 232 meters
- Clearance below: 103 meters
- Capacity: 100 people

Location
- Interactive map of Duonagao Suspension Bridge

The Duonagao Suspension Bridge (traditional Chinese: 多納高吊橋; simplified Chinese: 多纳高吊桥; pinyin: Duōnàgāo Diàoqiáo) is a suspension bridge in Maolin District, Kaohsiung, Taiwan.

== History ==
The bridge was originally built by the government during the Japanese rule of taiwan. In 1998, the bridge was rebuilt. It underwent maintenance which was completed on 17 February 2015.

== Architecture ==
The head of the bridge is decorated with Rukai totems and decorations. The bridge can carry a maximum load of 100 people at a given time. It spans over 232 meters length which crosses the Zhuokou River and has a clearance of 103 meters below it.

== See also ==
- List of bridges in Taiwan
