= Shetou =

Rural township in Changhua County, Taiwan

Shetou Township
- Rural township
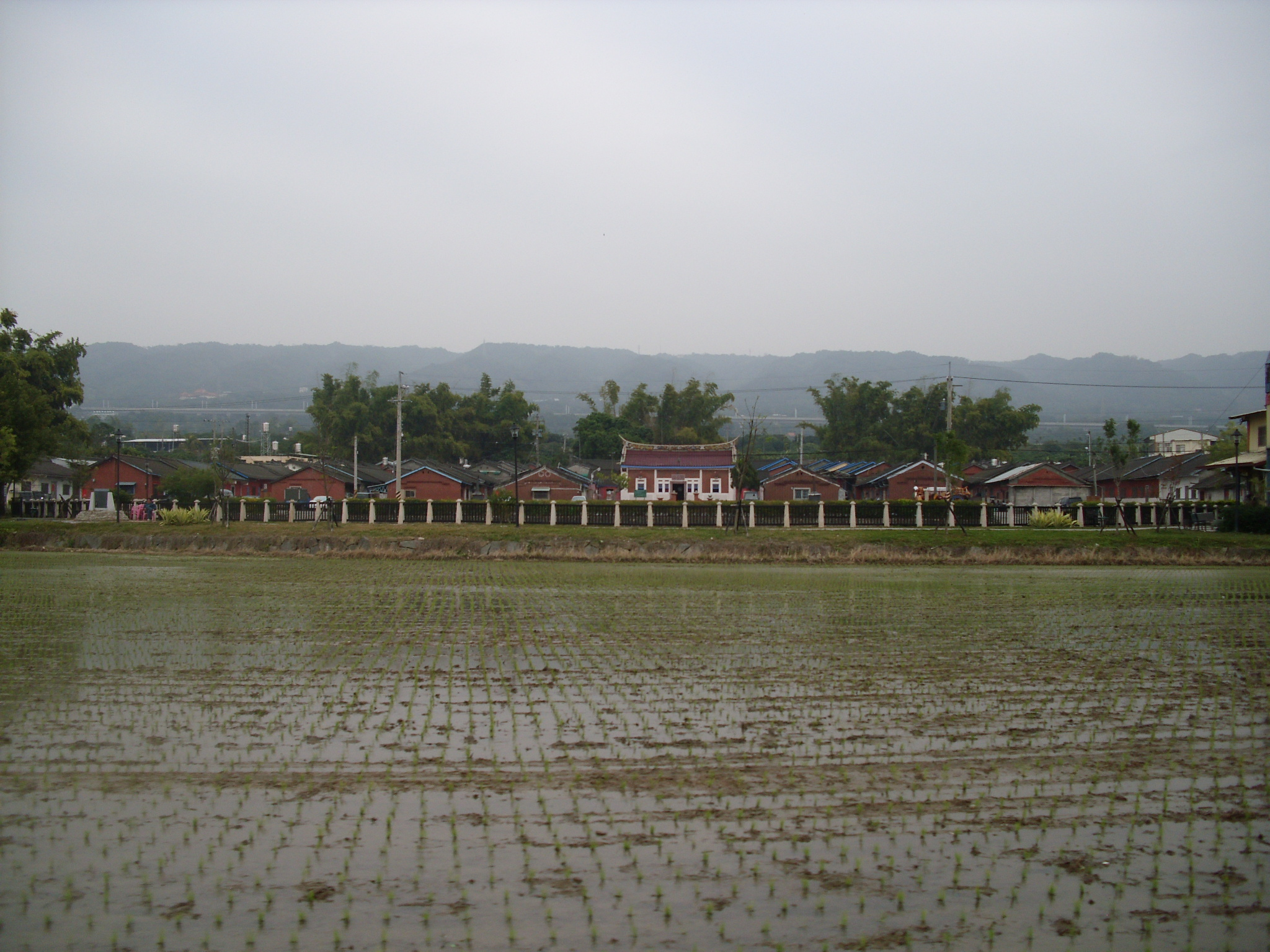

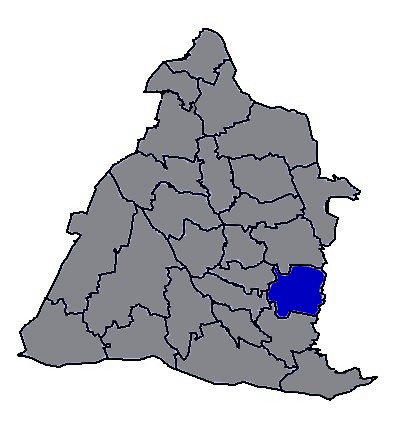
- Shetou Township in Changhua County
- Coordinates: 23°54′27.4″N 120°35′57.3″E
- Location: Changhua County, Taiwan

Area
  - Total: 36 km^{2} (14 sq mi)

Population (March 2023)
  - Total: 41,571
  - Density: 1,200/km^{2} (3,000/sq mi)

Chinese name
- Chinese: 社頭鄉
- Hanyu Pinyin: Shètóu Xiāng
- Wade–Giles: She^{4}-t'ou^{2} Hsiang^{1}
- Pha̍k-fa-sṳ: Sa-thèu-hiông
- Hokkien POJ: Siā-thâu-hiong

Shetou Township is a rural township in Changhua County, Taiwan.

== Geography ==
Shetou has a population of 41,571 (March 2023) and an area of 36.14 square kilometres (13.95 sq mi).

== Administrative divisions ==
The township comprises 24 villages: Beidou, Guangfu, Guangxing, Jiushe, Liren, Longjing, Lunya, Meiya, Nande, Nanya, Pinghe, Qiaotou, Qingshui, Renhe, Renya, Shanhu, Shetou, Songzhu, Taian, Tungxing, Xiehe, Xincuo, Zhangcuo and Zhaoxing.

== Tourist attractions ==
- Fangqiaotou Tianmen Temple
- Houtanjing Sky Bridge
- Shetou Doushan Temple

== Transportation ==
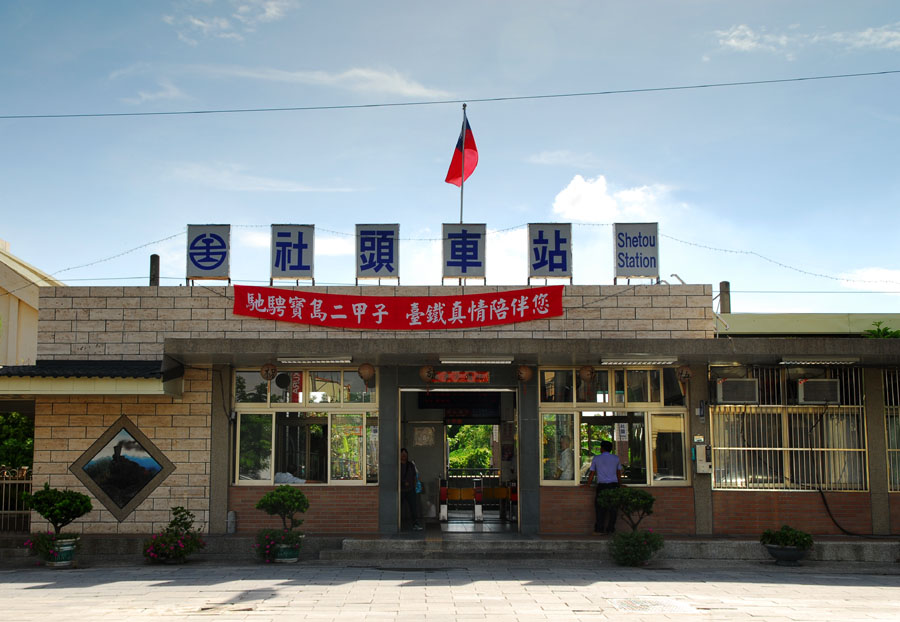
Shetou Station

- Taiwan Railway Shetou Station

== Notable natives ==
- Fang Wen-lin, singer and actress
