= Rainbow Bridge (Taipei) =

Bridge in Taiwan

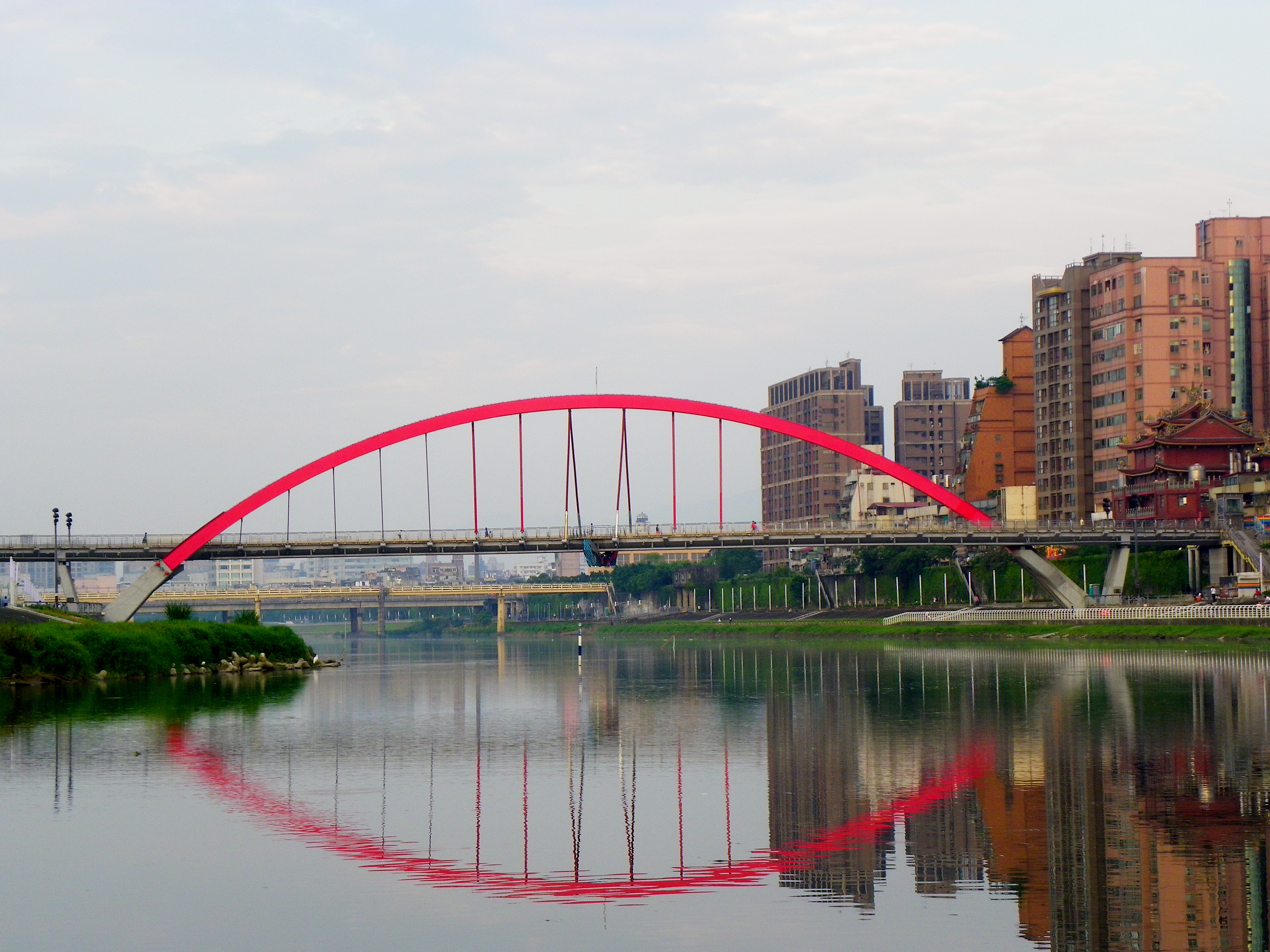
- The bridge in 2011
- Coordinates: 25°03′08″N 121°34′36″E
- Crosses: Keelung River
- Locale: Between Neihu and Songshan, Taipei

Characteristics
- Design: arch bridge
- Total length: 167 meters
- Width: 4.5 meters

History
- Construction start: 2005
- Construction cost: NT$110 million
- Inaugurated: 2007

The Rainbow Bridge is a pedestrian bridge in Taipei, Taiwan. It spans the Keelung River. The bridge has been described as "romantic" by Lonely Planet.

== See also ==
- List of bridges in Taiwan
