= Xiwei Bridge =

Bridge in Wuri, Taichung, Taiwan

Xiwei Bridge 溪尾大橋
- Coordinates: 24°03′03.0″N 120°38′23.1″E
- Carries: Section 8 and 9, Huanzhong Road
- Crosses: Dadu River
- Locale: Wuri District, Taichung, Taiwan

Characteristics
- Design: Cable-stayed, tied-arch, and girder
- Total length: 2.088 km (1.297 mi)
- Width: 12 m (39 ft)
- No. of lanes: 2

History
- Construction start: July 2014
- Construction cost: NT$829,000,000
- Opened: November 21, 2016

Location
- Interactive map of Xiwei Bridge

Xiwei Bridge (Chinese: 溪尾大橋; pinyin: Xīwěi Dàqiáo) is a bridge across the Dadu River in Wuri District, Taichung City, Taiwan. The bridge connects Taichung with Xiwei Village, a pene-exclave on the southwest bank of the river. Another bridge, known as the Xiwei Second Bridge (Chinese: 溪尾二橋), serves as the road's westward extension into Fenyuan Township, Changhua County.

== History ==
The Dadu River has historically been the boundary between Taichung and Changhua. On August 7, 1959, a major flood changed the course of the river and isolated Xiwei Village from the rest of Taichung. While there are multiple roads connecting Xiwei to Changhua County, there was no direct method for Xiwei residents to reach Taichung.

The groundbreaking ceremony for the main bridge was held on July 30, 2014, and the bridge's construction was completed on November 21, 2016. On the Xiwei end, the road stopped at a T-intersection with the one-lane, 2.5 m (8 ft 2 in) Qingguang Road, which led to frequent accidents as cars tried to pass each other in the narrow space. Three passing areas were built in 2017 as a temporary solution while the second bridge was under construction.

The groundbreaking ceremony for the Xiwei Second Bridge occurred on October 31, 2018, and was completed on February 6, 2021.

== Design ==
Xiwei Bridge is 2.088 km (1.297 mi) long and 12 m (39 ft) wide and carries two lanes of vehicular traffic. The road on the Wuri side is Huanzhong Road Section 8, while the Xiwei side is Huangzhong Road Section 9. The 1.3 km (0.81 mi) middle section is made of two steel tied-arch spans with two cable-stayed spans on each side. Girder bridges lead up to the middle section on both sides. The bridge cost NT$829,000,000 to build.

Xiwei Second Bridge is located to the west of Xiwei Bridge, carrying two lanes of traffic over the Maoluo River. The prestressed girder bridge is 380 m (1,250 ft) long, connecting Xiwei to Fenyuan Township in Changhua County. The construction cost NT$530,000,000 to build. The two bridges form a direct connection between National Freeway 3 and Provincial Highway 14.

== See also ==
- List of bridges in Taiwan
