= Shetou railway station =

Railway station located in Changhua, Taiwan

Shetou 社頭車站
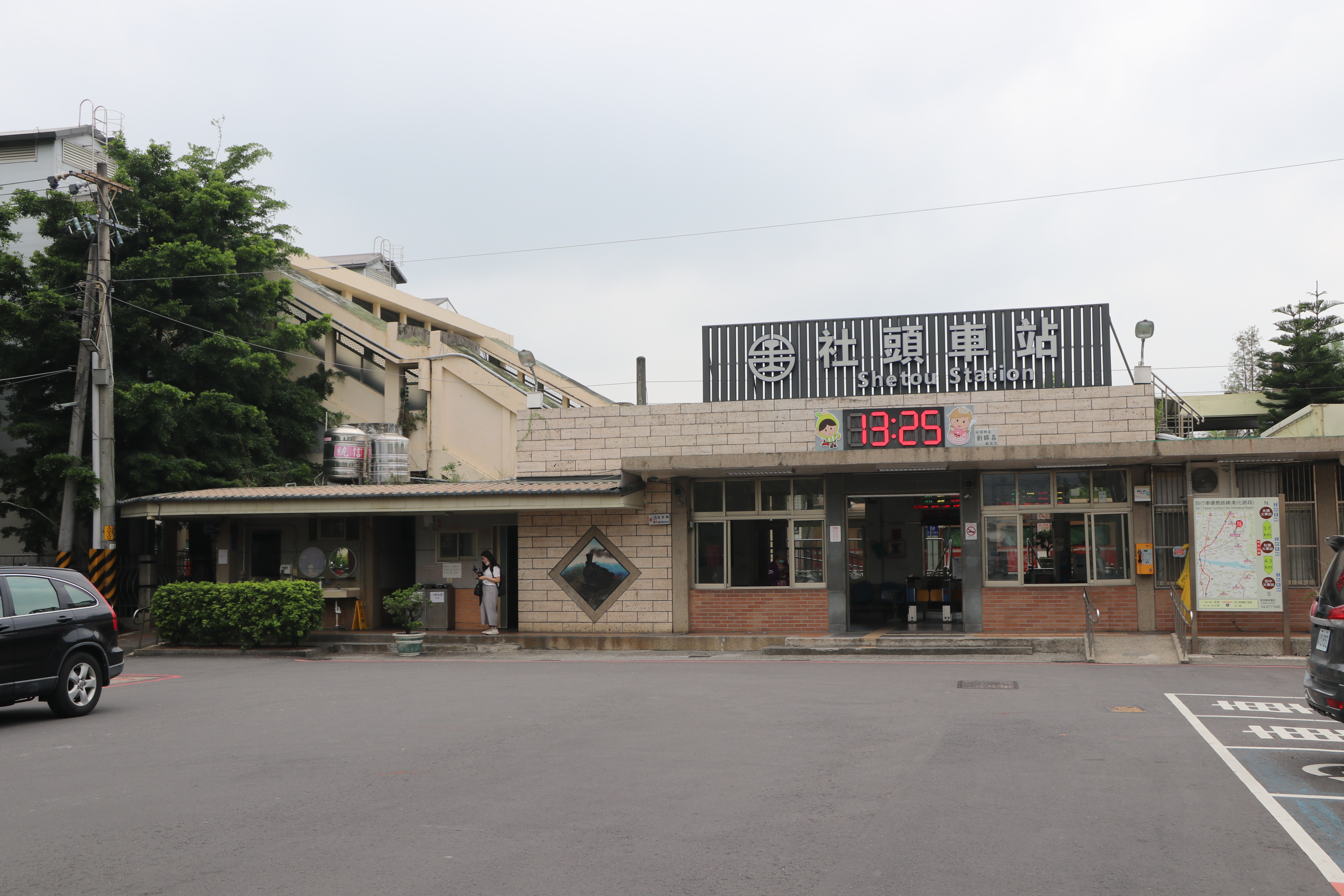

General information
- Location: Shetou, Changhua County, Taiwan
- Coordinates: 23°53′44.6″N 120°34′49.4″E
- System: Railway station
- Owner: Taiwan Railway
- Operator: Taiwan Railway
- Line: Western Trunk line
- Train operators: Taiwan Railway

History
- Opened: 26 March 1905

Passengers
- 2,249 daily (2024)

Services
Preceding station	Taiwan Railway	Following station
Yongjing towards Keelung	Western Trunk line	Tianzhong towards Kaohsiung
Location

Shetou (Chinese: 社頭車站; pinyin: Shètóu Chēzhàn) is a railway station on Taiwan Railway West Coast line located in Shetou Township, Changhua County, Taiwan.

== Around the station ==
- Shetou Doushan Temple
- THSR Changhua Station

== See also ==
- List of railway stations in Taiwan
