= Tianmen Temple =

Temple in Changhua County, Taiwan

- 天門宮
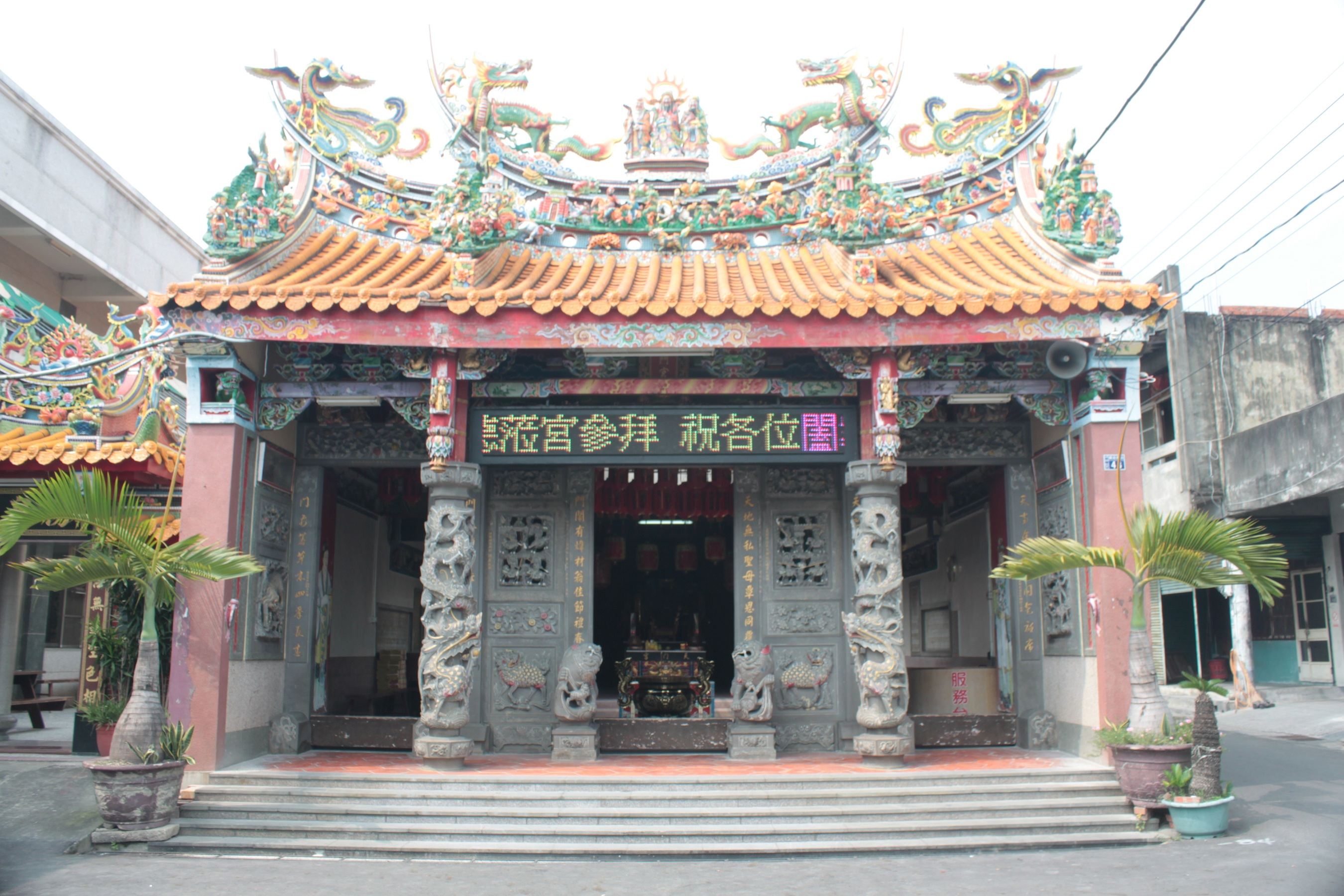
- Exterior of the temple

Religion
- Affiliation: Taoism
- Deity: Mazu

Location
- Location: Shetou, Changhua County
- Country: Taiwan
- Interactive map of Tianmen Temple
- Coordinates: 23.9167°N 120.5822°E

Architecture
- Completed: 1755
- Direction of façade: South

Fangqiaotou Tianmen Temple (Chinese: 枋橋頭天門宮; pinyin: Fāngqiáotóu Tiānmén Gōng) is a temple located in Fangqiaotou, Shetou Township, Changhua County, Taiwan. The temple is dedicated to the sea goddess Mazu, and is protected as a county-level monument.

== History ==
Han Chinese began migrating to Changhua in the late 17th century, with the Changhua area primarily inhabited by settlers from Zhangzhou. In 1755, a merchant moved from Lukang to Fangqiaotou. He invited the Mazu from Lukang Tianhou Temple to divide her spirit and travel with him. Then, he built a small temple, which was initially named Fangqiaotou Tianhou Temple. The temple was enlarged in 1798.

In the 18th century, conflicts between Zhangzhou, Quanzhou, and Hakka settlers worsened all over the west coast of Taiwan. In Changhua, seventy-two Zhangzhou and Hakka villages banded together to defend themselves against Quanzhou attacks in an alliance named the "Seventy-two Villages of Fangqiaotou" (枋橋頭七十二庄). In 1845, the villages collectively refurbished and enlarged the temple as a sign of their unity and moved their own Mazu statues to inside. Additionally, Zhen'an Temple was built nearby to worship the Lords of the Three Mountains, their hometown deity. The temple was renamed to Tianmen Temple in 1890 when worshippers made their first pilgrimage to Lukang Tianhou Temple. Between 1959 and 1961, Tianmen Temple was renovated again with the help of the seventy-two villages.

On 19 January 2012, Tianmen Temple was protected by the Changhua County Government as a county-level monument for its historical importance and the relics inside.

== Worship ==
Worshippers from the seventy-two villages will periodically make pilgrimages to Lukang Tianhou Temple on foot. The timing of the pilgrimages is unique: they occur three years in a row, then do not occur for seven years. The pilgrimages always occurs on two lunar months, meaning that they leave at the end of the third month and return on the fourth. This practice began as a reference to how in the past, the difficult road conditions often stretched the trek past a month.
