= Toucheng Kaicheng Temple Chenghuang Temple =

Coordinates: 24.855668°N 121.821810°E

The Toucheng Kaicheng Temple Chenghuang Temple, it is a Guanyin Temple combined with a City God Temple located in Xinjianli, Toucheng Town, Yilan County, Taiwan. It primarily worships Guanyin Bodhisattva and Anxi City God, with Wusha as a secondary deity..On the 30th day of the seventh lunar month, it holds a traditional 'Toucheng Ghost Grappling Festival' event.

== History ==
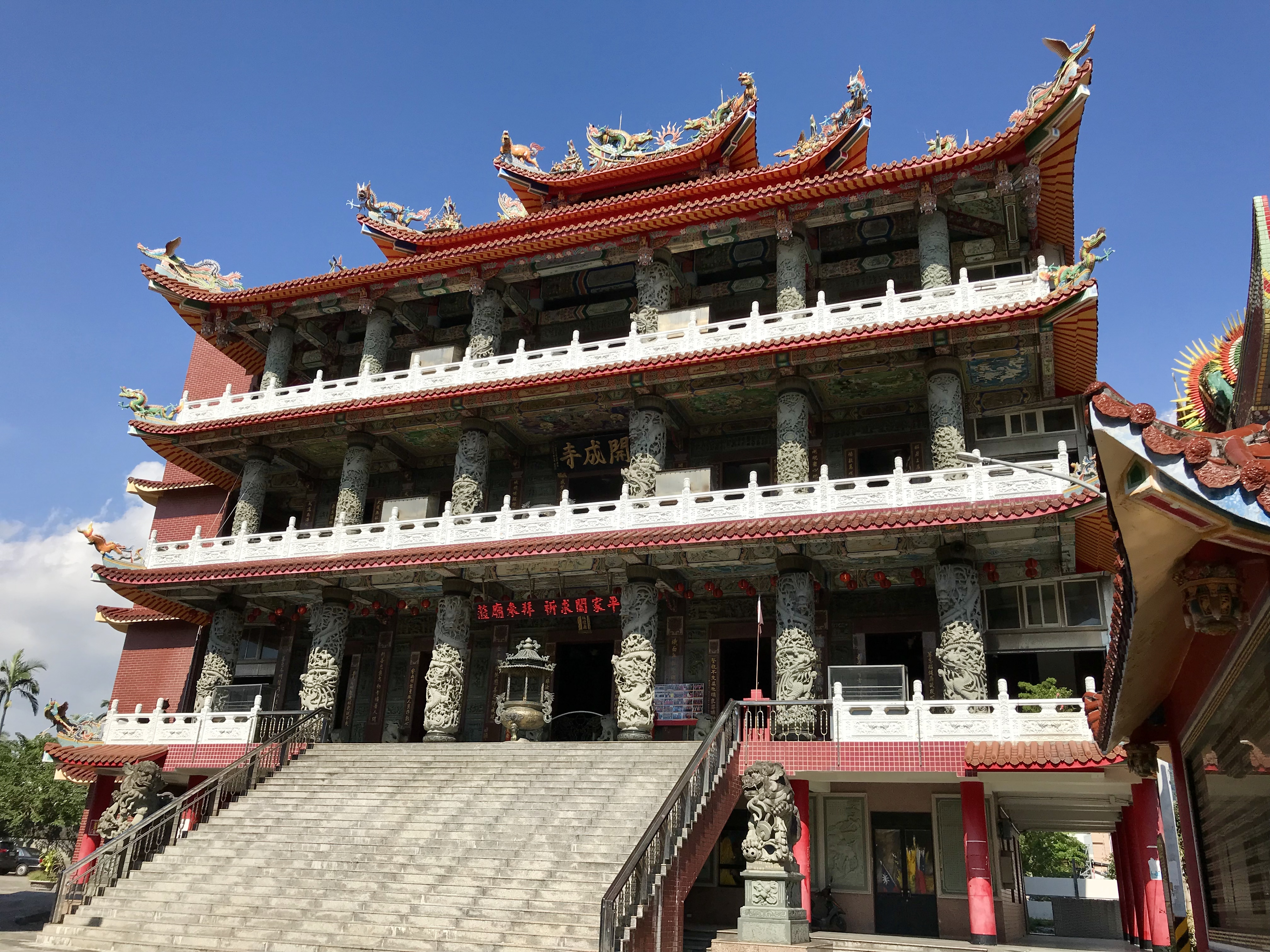
Temple Body

It is said that the Guanyin statue in this temple was brought by Wu Sha in the first year of the Jiaqing reign (1796), when he led settlers to begin cultivation.A thatched hut was built near the present-day railway bridge over Fude Keng Creek Fude Keng Creek to enshrine the statue。In the second year of Jiaqing（1797）a temple was built，called "Fozu Temple"。 The following year, Wu Sha passed away. In the fourth year of Jiaqing (1799), the people built Wu Sha Temple on the right side of the temple. A few years later, a left wing was added to honor Da Zhong Ye, which became known as the “Da Zhong Ye Temple."。 .

In the 25th year of Daoguang (1845), a flood in Fude Keng Creek revealed a statue believed to be the City God of Anxi (Note: isCity God of Anxi，See the revolving lantern display of temple photos.) .The statue was then brought to the Fo Zu Miao and enshrined alongside the existing deities.。 .

In the 8th year of Emperor Xianfeng (1858), Wang Zhaohong, the county magistrate of Touwei County, erected a Monument of Glorious Deeds in front of Wushi Port. He also gathered the remains of local militia and established the Kailan Hero Shrine beside the temple, (Note: Kailan Yingling Shrine is located in the alley to the left of the City God Temple of Kaicheng Temple in Toucheng.。) where an annual memorial ceremony is held on the 13th day of the 7th lunar month.。

In the third year of the Tongzhi reign (1864), the Fo Zu Temple and the Kailan Yingling Shrine were destroyed by floods. The following year, it was rebuilt at its current location and renamed "Kaicheng Temple". In the fifth year of the Tongzhi reign (1866), it was presented with a plaque with the inscription "CiYunPu Bei". In the eleventh year of the Tongzhi reign (1872), the Zhaode Shrine was built on the left side of Kaicheng Temple, enshrining Yang Tingli, Wu Sha, Lai Keji, Xu Tiansong, Lin Hanzhong, Zhang Deming, He Changxing, Zhao Longsheng, Ke Youcheng, Wu Yifei, Huang Junzuo, and Lin. In the same year, it was presented with a plaque with the inscription "FayuPeilan".

In 1903, a spirit medium at the newly built General Temple claimed that the City God wished to have a dedicated temple. In response, local gentry such as Lin Zanwu, Lin Zhenli, Wu Shicheng, Wu Rui, Wu Chengkun, Li Xiu, Zou Wang, Huang Zhiyuan, and Chen Liang raised funds. However, due to delays, the Toucheng City God Temple was not completed and consecrated next to Kai Cheng Temple until the sixth day of the first lunar month in 1920. After a flood control embankment was built along Fude Keng Creek, the Fenglai Market, originally located by the creek, was relocated to the plaza in front of Kai Cheng Temple and the City God Temple.

In 1989, the management committees of Toucheng Kaicheng Temple and Toucheng Chenghuang Temple decided to merge the two temples. In October of that year, the old temple was demolished and the temple purchased an additional 260 pings of land to build a new 660 pings. At the end of April 1994, several century-old deity statues stored in a temporary metal shed were stolen. The City God Temple lost two statues of Dong Pai Ye, one each of the Seventh and Eighth Lords, one civil and one martial judge, two statues of the City God’s wife, and one of Zhusheng Niangniang . Kai Cheng Temple lost one statue of Guanyin Bodhisattva.

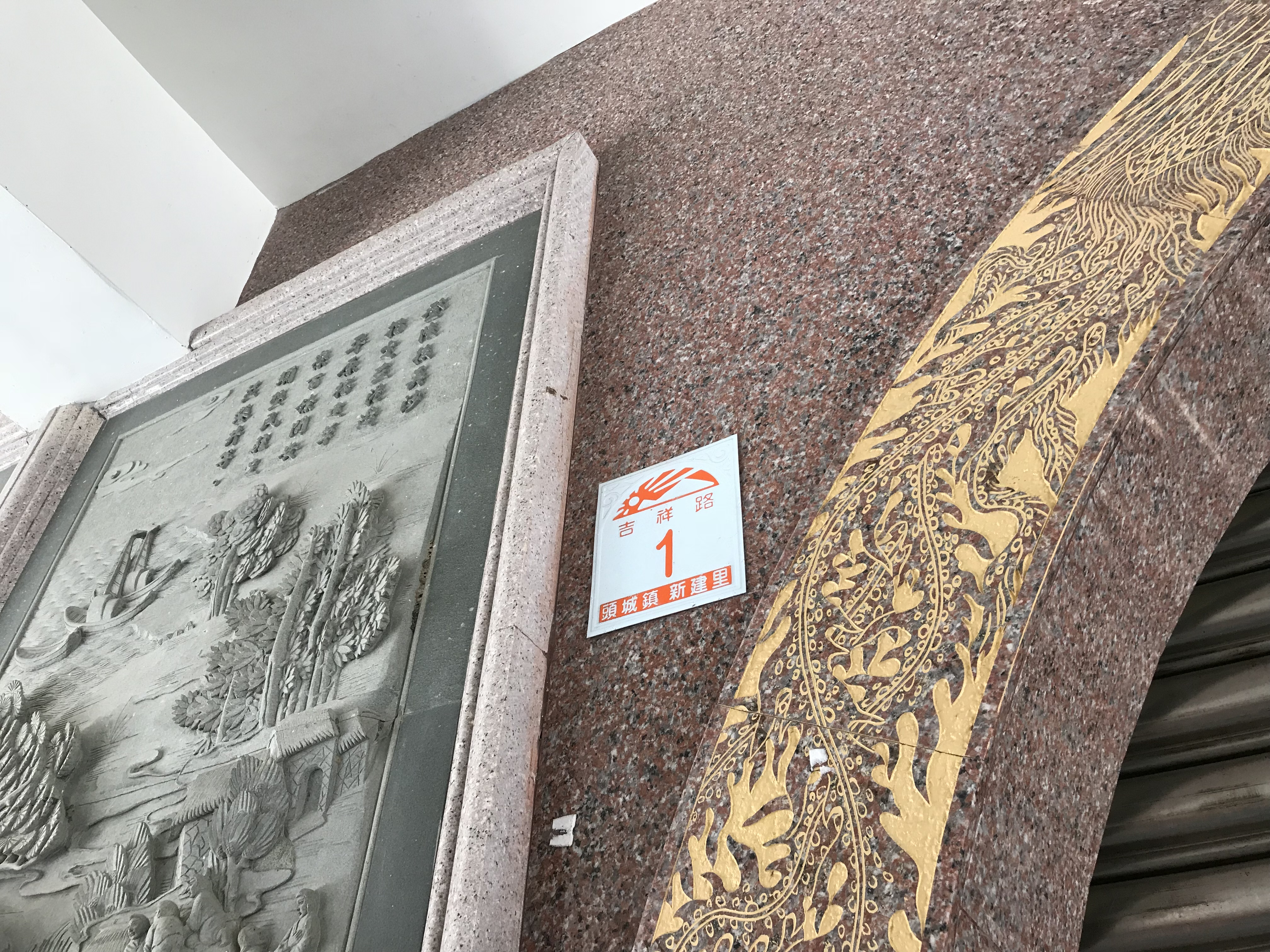
The temple is located at No. 1, Jixiang Road, Xinjianli

On October 14, 1998, at 10:30 a.m., an inauguration ceremony was held. Attendees included County Government Secretary-General Chen Yuanfa, Director of Civil Affairs Chen Mushui, Chairperson of the Provincial Fishermen’s Association Zheng Meilan, Chairman of the Temple Reconstruction Committee Qiu Jinyu, Chairman of the Temple Management Committee Zhuang Xicai, and Wu Dewang, the eighth-generation descendant of Wu Sha.

== Statue ==
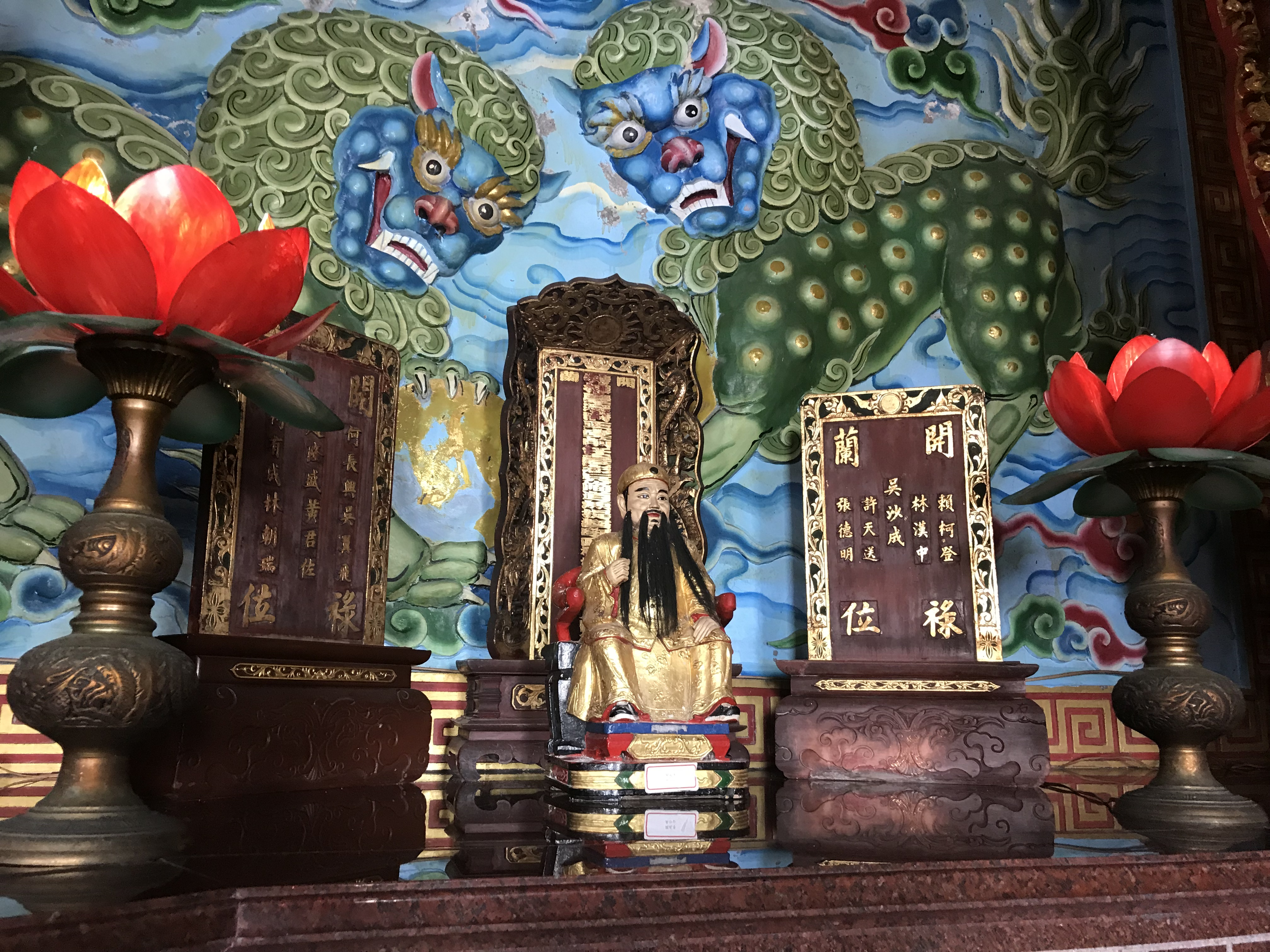
Statue of Wu Sha

The temple’s City God statue is accompanied by statues of his children, which were donated by worshippers in the Year of the Dragon (1976). Initially, there were seven sons. To avoid the perception of favoring males over females, three daughter statues were later added.

The six officials statues that accompany the City God are said to have been carved by Luo Azhong from Toucheng. On October 21, 2005, Lee Yi-Hsing, a professor at Da-Yeh University, viewed the six statues and praised them for breaking the traditional 1:4 scale used in deity sculpture. Instead, they were carved to be proportional to real human figures at a reduced size, with delicate expressions and lifelike postures — a rare style in Taiwan.

In 2007, the Lanyang Museum counted the number of the Shenmeng (Note: Different from southern Taiwan where most people call Daxian Wengzai "Jiang Ye", Toucheng area mostly calls it "Dashen Weng". Some believers think that calling it "Wangzai" is quite disrespectful.。)Association under this City God Temple system, with a total of 26 large Shenmengs. During the Spring Festival processions, the temple’s deity figures participate in the parade. The procession is led by two small ghost figures, followed closely by Qing Ye (Lord Green) and Bai Ye (Lord White).

== Pudu ==
The religious events in Toucheng include "Toucheng Dabaibai (Note: The Toucheng Grand Worship Ceremony is held in Toucheng City God Temple and Toucheng Dongyue Temple in turn. It is first held on the sixth day of the first lunar month by Toucheng City God Temple, and on the sixteenth day of the third lunar month by Toucheng Dongyue Temple the following year.。)" and" Toucheng QiangGu". The so-called "Toucheng QiangGu" is actually the last event of the Zhongyuan Festival at Kaicheng Temple in Toucheng.

The purpose of Kai Cheng Temple’s Zhongyuan Pudu (Universal Salvation Ritual) is closely related to the history of Toucheng’s early development. During the Jiaqing period, Wu Sha led settlers to cultivate the area, resulting in many casualties. Since many of those who died were single migrants without descendants to perform ancestral rites, local residents felt compelled to organize this ritual to honor and console the deceased.

=== Organizational Structure ===
The four main roles collectively known as the “Four Great Pillars” or “Top Four Pillars” — Master of Ceremonies, Master of Rituals, Master of the Altar, and Master of Universal Salvation — are responsible for organizing key aspects of the Ghost Festival ceremonies. Each role is held by one individual.The Master of Ceremonies serves as the overall supervisor of the ritual altar.The Master of Rituals supervises the Taoist priests and is in charge of the religious ceremonies.The Master of the Altar is responsible for the construction and dismantling of the ritual altar.The Master of Universal Salvation oversees the Pudu ritual and handles offerings and charitable distributions.Below the Four Great Pillars, there are assistant roles such as Deputy Chairperson, Association Chairperson, City Chairperson, and Assistant Chairperson, collectively referred to as the “Four Minor Pillars” or “Lower Four Pillars,” who assist with execution and logistics.

For the “Dou Shou” (Section Heads), representatives are selected from Toucheng’s 24 village neighborhoods and from Baiyun and Yushi villages in Jiaoxi Township.When the Qiang Gu event was revived in 1991, new ceremonial roles were added: Lantern Chief, Treasure Chief, Hundred Blessings Chief, Peace Chief, Prosperity Chief, National Prosperity Chief, Wealth Chief, and Unity Chief .Originally, there was also a Water Official Chief, but since no group was willing to take on this role, it was removed.The Hundred Blessings Chief is held by the furnace master from the original Wuling Village 29 Corners Association.The Unity Chief is held by the furnace master of Xin Yi Society, (Note: Also known as "high and low", high refers to stores that display goods on shelves, and low refers to roadside stalls.。) an association formed by local vendors.The Auspicious Chief is held by a furnace master representing the town’s butchers and meat vendors.

The Annual Furnace Master is a fictional figure with the pseudonym for "Lin Biying". According to legend, vengeful wandering spirits displeased with the Pudu ritual might seek out the furnace master. As no one dares to take on the responsibility, a fictitious name is used instead.

=== Venue layout ===
.In the past, the ceremonial site for both the Jiaoju and the Qiang Gu event was held in front of Kai Cheng Temple in Toucheng. However, since 2004, the event was relocated to Wushi Harbor, with only the Main Universal Salvation Altar remaining at Kai Cheng Temple. In addition to the main general Jiaoju held in Kaicheng Temple, the other three main Jiaoju altars, namely the Master of Ceremonies, Master of Rituals, and Master of the Altar, were set up in front of Wuying Tudigong Temple in Wuying Village, on the road behind Nanmen Fude Temple in Chengnan Village, and in front of Xinjian General Temple in Xinjian Village.

On the first day of the seventh lunar month, a groundbreaking ceremony is held at the site. Bamboo is used to construct temporary structures. The Orphan Spirit Tower and the Food Offering Pavilion (Note: In the early years, Toucheng Qingyuan Temple and Toucheng Kaicheng Temple City God Temple would make rice tents。) are erected to the left and right, respectively, in front of the ritual altar. A traditional performance stage is also set up behind the Orphan Tower. A spirit pole with lanterns is erected in front of the altar to invite deities and wandering spirits.The Three Pure Ones Altar must face another Three Pure Ones Altar. Paper effigies and symbolic paper structures — such as Da Shi Ye (Great Lord of the Afterlife), Hanlin Court, Common Return Pavilion, Gold Mountain, Silver Mountain, and Scripture Robe Mountain — are placed within sturdy, sheltered tents on both sides of the altar.

=== Jiaoju ceremony process ===
From the Japanese occupation to 2000, the Jiaoju ceremony was conducted by Buddhists. Later, due to the initiative of local believers, the ceremony was changed to be conducted by Taoist priests of the Zhengyi school after throwing divination blocks in front of the gods.

| | | | Zhengyi Ceremony Process |
|---|---|---|---|
| Order | Time | Ceremony name | Content |
| 1 | 7:00 p.m. on the 27th day of the seventh lunar month | Burn incense and start practicing. Pray and publish the chapter. | The Gongcao messenger presents a written document to announce the start of the Three Realms Ceremony and invite the gods to descend to inspect the ceremony. After the ceremony begins, all participants must be vegetarian until the third day when they kowtow to the Three Realms to thank the gods for their grace. |
| 2 | Morning of the 28th day of the seventh lunar month | Invite the gods to worship the altar | On the first morning of the first day of the Jiao Ceremony, a ceremony of invocation is held to welcome the Three Pure Ones to the Jiao Altar. A high-ranking Taoist priest invites the Great General Jiufeng Pohui and all the gods to descend on the altar, and burns a document called "Jiufeng Pohui Certificate" in front of the altar. Then, the gods of the three realms are invited to perform the Jiao Ceremony in order. This process is the daily morning ritual of the Jiao Ceremony. On the second day, the third day is called "Zhongbai Qisheng", and the ritual is the same. |
| 3 | | Worship the Bodhisattva and call upon the lonely souls | The paper statue of the Great Master is consecrated and placed under the tent next to the altar together with the paper statues of Hanlinyuan, Tongguisuo, etc. for worship by the believers of Dou Shou. |
| 4 | | Respectfully Issued the Heaven and Earth Announcement | Red paper with the characters of various figures of the gods, called "Dragon, Zhang, Phoenix and Seal", and yellow paper with the words "the ceremony is held to provide relief to lonely souls" written on it are posted. |
| 5 | | Pay tribute to the temple | The Taoist priest goes to all the major temples and homes of the Dou Shou in the ritual area to report to the deities being worshipped and announce the start of the ritual. |
| 6 | | Please clean the altar with water | The Taoist priest leads the Dou Shou in the Three Realms Altar and invites the Water God, River God, He Bo, and the Four Seas Dragon God to descend. He reads the water request letter, then burns the letter in a bucket in front of the altar, and then takes water from the bucket to sprinkle inside and outside the altar one by one. |
| 7 | | Worship the Kitchen God | The Nine Heavens Cloud Kitchen and the fasting supervisory messenger come to purify the offerings. |
| 8 | Afternoon of the 28th day of the seventh lunar month | Three Officials Miao Jing | The Taoist priest recited the "Three Officials Wonderful Sutra" and said that ghosts should convert to Buddhism and pay homage to the Three Officials in order to seek rebirth. |
| 9 | | Beidou Zhenjing | The Taoist priest recited the "Northern Dipper Sutra" and used the name of the Northern Dipper Star God to repent and eliminate disasters. |
| 10 | | Starry Sky Repentance | The Taoist priest recited the "Starry Sky Repentance" to express the repentance of the Dou Shou believers to Ziwei and the stars in the sky, praying to relieve the disaster and make the believers and good people's Yuanchen glorious. |
| 11 | | Three Yuan Bao Repentance | The Taoist priest recited the "Three Yuan Precious Repentance" and sincerely confessed his sins in order to obtain redemption. |
| 12 | | Wish the lanterns to prolong life | The Taoist priest went to the Dou lanterns enshrined in the Dou Shou and illuminated all the Dou lanterns with fire, thereby extending the life of all the Dou Shou believers. |
| 13 | | Command water to ban altars and sweep away the foul atmosphere | The Taoist priest holds the Five Thunder Order in his hand and imitates the four spirits, Azure Dragon, Vermillion Bird, White Tiger and Black Tortoise, in sequence. He then casts a barrier on the five directions using the martial arts movements of the Northern Tube's "Qin Qiong Inverted Bronze Flag". |
| 14 | Morning of the 29th day of the seventh lunar month | Early start | Invite the gods to come and judge the ceremony. |
| 15 | | Morning morning lectures and teachings | Visiting the 32 Heavenly Gods for Saving People can be roughly divided into the following steps: burning incense to invite the gods, entering the mind, entering the house, burning five-old incense, lighting the incense burner, inviting the Nine Imperial Gods, making offerings, submitting a memorial with the flying Gang, reciting the "Sutra for Saving People", restoring the incense burnesubmitting a petition with a flying Gang, burning five-old incense, leaving the house, thanking the master saint, and leaving the altar. |
| 16 | | Walking in the afternoon Jade Pivot Precious Sutra | Paying respect to the Nine Heavens Thunder God is divided into the following steps: burning incense to invite the gods, entering the mind, announcing the petition, entering the house, burning incense for the five elders, lighting the incense burner, inviting the Nine Imperials, making offerings, summoning the Four Spirits, sealing the Gen direction, reciting the Jade Pivot Sutra, restoring the incense burner, burning incense for the five elders, leaving the house, thanking the master, and leaving the altar. |
| 17 | Afternoon of the 29th day of the seventh lunar month | Late morning lecture Northern Dipper Sutra | Paying respect to the Great Saint of Zhongtian and the Nine Emperor Star Gods of Beidou is divided into the following steps: burning incense to invite the gods, entering the mind, entering the house, burning the five old incense, lighting the incense burner, inviting the Nine Imperial Gods, making offerings, submitting a memorial with the flying Gang, reciting the "Beidou Sutra", restoring the incense burner, burning the five old incense, leaving the house, thanking the master saint, and leaving the altar. |
| 18 | | Resolving grievances and untying knots | Two Taoist priests stood on both sides of the Three Realms Table, one of them recited the crimes that people could commit, and the other led the believers to confess their sins to the Heavenly Lord of Resolving Wrongs and Forgiving Sins. Another Taoist priest led the believers to circumambulate the altar, and burned the "Jie Yun Jing" on a bucket in front of the Three Realms Table, and threw coins into the bucket to pray for blessings. |
| 19 | | Lighting up water lanterns | The Taoist priest led the believers to the mouth of Zhuan River and released water lanterns (Note: Each village in Toucheng has its own name for its own water lanterns. The water lantern in Dakeng is the first to be set off, so it is called the "Water Lantern Head". 。) when the tide receded, inviting the lonely souls in the water to come ashore and participate in the general food offering ceremony the next afternoon. |
| 20 | | Open the long fragrance The jar is full of strange fragrance | The two Taoist priests offer incense, an action called "three times entering the palace". |
| 21 | Morning of the 30th day of the seventh lunar month | Knock in reply to the three realms Thank you for the grace of God | This is what folk customs call "worshipping the God of Heaven". The Taoist priest invites the gods of the three realms and the gods of local temples in order, reads a petition in front of the gods of the three realms, reports the names of the donors of this ceremony, and asks for blessings, and repays the gods with sacrificial offerings. After this ceremony, the vegetarian diet can be lifted. |
| 22 | | The morning ceremony of the ceremony | The last ceremony of the ritual is the Su Chao, but unlike other ceremonies, there is no ritual of chanting scriptures. Instead, the ritual is to pay homage to the Heavenly Emperor Wanfu Zhenjun, with the aim of asking for proof of the merits of the ritual. The Taoist priest will present the prayers on behalf of the master of the ritual and the head of the Dou Shou. |
| 23 | Afternoon of the 30th day of the seventh lunar month | Hong Wen Jia Zan | The two Taoist priests recited the "Yushu Sutra" in a dialogue and rhyme style to preach Taoism to the believers in Dou Shou. |
| 24 | | Worship Wu Shagong | Wu Sha was invited to perform sacrifices in the altar, and the chairman of the festival association offered incense on behalf of the altar. |
| 25 | | Rewarding soldiers and generals | Offer sacrificial offerings and kowtow to thank the officials guarding the altar. |
| 26 | | The imperial drums are hung together, and the tent is filled with music. | It is also called "noisy tent". Beiguan is played on the tent to create a lively atmosphere. Then the Great Master and related paper-made figures are placed in the tent, and the team led by leather drums and suonas is led to the place of placement, which is called "Great Master's Parade". |
| 27 | | Invite the master to take the seat Pursue the case and purify the orphan | The chairman of the ritual association respectfully invites the chief Taoist priest to come on stage to preside over the general charity. Then the chief Taoist priest leads the Taoist group to the Great Bodhisattva and summons the lonely souls from the five directions. The chief Taoist priest then leads the Taoist group and the chief Taoist priests to patrol the general salvation site as well as the food tent and the lonely tent. |
| 28 | | Go on stage to give relief Give relief to ghosts | The Taoist priest wearing the Five Elders' Crown ascended the altar, representing the Eastern Palace's benevolent father, Taiyi Jiuku Tianzun, and played a board to build a bridge, indicating that he was leading the lonely souls here to receive relief. Afterwards, he read the "Ten Injury Talisman" on the Jiuku platform to help the lonely souls who died due to the ten injuries, and then, with the help of spells and formulas, he threw the offerings to the surroundings one by one, expressing the intention of feeding the lonely souls. |
| 29 | | Jin Bao Zai Xiang | The Taoist priest chanted 24 "Blade and Weaponry" poems, inserting a stick of incense on the buns for each chant, a total of 20 poems. After the chanting, the lonely soul petition was read, and after reading, the petition and the soul-calling banner were inserted four times on the buns incense, and the flower rice was placed in the positioning petition as the final food offering. Then the long incense was taken over by the director of the ritual association, who held the incense and bowed to the husband. After placing the incense on the lonely shed, the five animals on the lonely shed were turned around, representing that the universal salvation had arrived here. After the incense was finished, the Taoist priest chanted the formula to disperse the lonely souls, and finally burned the gold paper and the paper-made items used for the universal salvation, such as the Great Master. |
| 30 | | The altar of thanksgiving | The Taoist holds a white chicken and a white duck in his hands. He uses the blood from the white chicken's comb to represent extreme yang, and the white duck to represent its homonym "ya", which means "to drive away the evil spirits" and issue orders. |
| 31 | | Knock to thank the lantern pole Send the holy carriage | After the talisman was passed, a Taoist priest holding a seven-star sword came to the poles, lowered all the flags and lights on the poles, and chopped three times on the poles facing the sun and the poles facing the moon, indicating that the task of summoning the spirits had been completed. Afterwards, the Taoist priests sent the spirits back to the palace one by one in front of the Sanqing Altar. |
| 32 | | Zhong Kui's Orphan | The purpose of this ritual is to ensure that although the Taoist rites have concluded, any lingering wandering spirits (orphaned souls) still around the orphan tower are driven away by Zhong Kui, the demon-quelling deity, so that the Qiang Gu (Orphan-Grabbing) contest can proceed smoothly. On the stage, ritual lanterns representing the Northern Dipper and Southern Dipper stars are set up, with a third lantern in the center representing Lord Xiqin, the ancestral deity. The actor portraying Zhong Kui strikes the four corners of the stage with a straw mat, uses the blood of a white chicken to consecrate talismans, and nails a live white chicken onto the stage with iron nails. A white duck is then used symbolically to escort the orphaned spirits back to the underworld. After Zhong Kui scatters a mixture of salt and rice in all directions, he smashes the porcelain bowl containing the mixture in front of the stage to mark the end of the performance. After that, the Qiang Gu contest officially begins. |

==== Qianggu Festival ====
In earlier times, there was a wharf in front of Qingyuan Temple in Toucheng. Boat owners from Dakeng Village would offer sailboat masts to build the orphan towers, making Toucheng’s towers taller than those in other regions. Additionally, because of Toucheng’s unique historical importance in Yilan’s development and Wu Sha’s pioneering efforts, the Qiang Gu event in Toucheng developed a distinctive structure and style.

A local legend from Yilan tells that when Yang Shifangwas young, he walked from Yilan to Toucheng to see the Qiang Gu event. Nearing the town, his straw sandals chafed his feet, so he took them off and hid them under a screw pine tree by the roadside, planning to retrieve them on the way back. Later, a group of wild ghosts passed by and saw a little ghost crouching under the tree, refusing to leave. They asked why it wasn’t going to grab food. The little ghost solemnly replied that the Earth God had temporarily assigned it the task of guarding a government official’s shoes. That screw pine tree later became the site of Yang Shifang’s grave.

There is little clear documentation about the Qiang Gu event in Toucheng during the Qing Dynasty in works like The Kavalan Gazetteer or Gazetteer of Kavalan Subprefecture. It wasn’t until the Japanese colonial era that records, reports, and studies began to appear. For example, a report in the Taiwan Daily News on September 8, 1935, highlighted the event as “the only one of its kind on the entire island.” In 1936 and 1937, Japanese scholars Fukutaro Masuda and Seiichiro Suzuki (Note: In his 1934 book "Taiwan's Old Customs of Weddings, Funerals and Festivals During the Year", Suzuki Seiichiro mentioned that places in northern Taiwan where the practice of kidnapping orphans was famous included Jieyun Temple in Banqiao, Tucheng, and Toucheng in Yilan. He also wrote that kidnapping orphans often resulted in heavy casualties.。) came to observe and document it. During the Japanese period, the event took on features of tourism, recreation, and entertainment: temporary trains were added to the Taipei-Yilan railway, Japanese police managed traffic, and exclusive product vendors used the event for advertising. However, the practice was later suppressed under the Imperialization Movement.

After the war, in 1946, Toucheng’s first township mayor, Lu Zunxiang proposed reviving the Qiang Gu Festival. However, during that year’s event held on the night of the 30th day of the seventh lunar month, one person died and another was injured. . (Note: According to custom, the person who steals the shed must leave two stacks of food on the shed as a reward for the workers who build and dismantle the shed. Legend has it that when dissatisfied workers built the shed that year, they deliberately made the gaps between the platform planks particularly narrow, making it impossible for climbers to reach their fingers in and grab a firm hold.)A safety net was added the following year, but accidents still occurred. As a result, Mayor Huang Zhuwang suspended the event. In 1949, during continued preparations by the town council, the Taipei County Yilan District Office ordered the event to be halted.

In 1991, the Yilan County Magistrate, You Si-kun, who emphasized the cultural foundation of the county, held activities such as the return of the Kavalan people to their hometown to trace their roots to commemorate the 195th anniversary of Wu Sha's reclamation of Yilan, and decided to resume the Toucheng Qiang Gu Festival. It was resumed in 1991 and stopped three years later. (Note: The custom is that the Qianggu Festival must be held for at least three consecutive years, otherwise it is said that it will cause dissatisfaction among ghosts.。) It was resumed again in 1996 and then stopped for another seven years until it was resumed in 2004.

In 2006, it was reported that local people from Kanding Township had gone to Toucheng several times to perform the Qiang Gu ceremony, hoping that the Pingtung County Government and the central government would provide funding to restore the Qiang Gu ceremony at Beiyuan Temple.
