= Dingpu =

Dingpu may refer to:

- Dingpu Station (Yilan), a train station on the Yilan Line operated by the Taiwan Railway Administration in Toucheng, Yilan County
- Dingpu metro station, the western terminus of the Bannan line operated by the Taipei Metro in New Taipei City.
- Dingpu Village (頂埔里), an urban village in Toucheng Township, Yilan County, Taiwan.
- Dingpu Village (頂埔里), an urban village in Xiangshan District, Hsinchu City, Taiwan.
- Dingpu Village (頂埔里), an urban village in Zhongpu Township, Changcha County, Taiwan.
- Dingpu Village (頂埔里), an urban village in Zhunan Township, Miaoli County, Taiwan.
