= Shicheng railway station (Taiwan) =

Railway station in Yilan County, Taiwan

Shicheng Station 石城車站
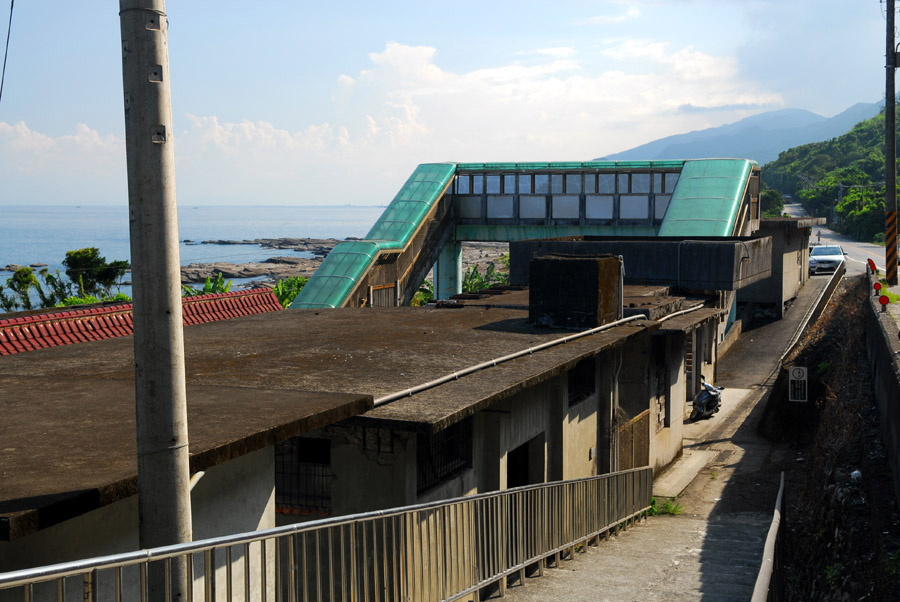

General information
- Location: Toucheng, Yilan County, Taiwan
- Coordinates: 24°58′42″N 121°56′43″E
- System: Train station
- Owner: Taiwan Railway Corporation
- Operator: Taiwan Railway Corporation
- Line: Eastern Trunk line
- Train operators: Taiwan Railway Corporation

History
- Opened: 1 May 1953

Passengers
- 72 daily (2024)

Services
Preceding station	Taiwan Railway	Following station
Fulong towards Badu	Eastern Trunk line	Dali towards Taitung
Location

The Shihcheng (Chinese: 石城車站; pinyin: Shíchéng Chēzhàn) is a railway station of Taiwan Railway Yilan line located at Toucheng Township, Yilan County, Taiwan. It is the easternmost train station in Taiwan.

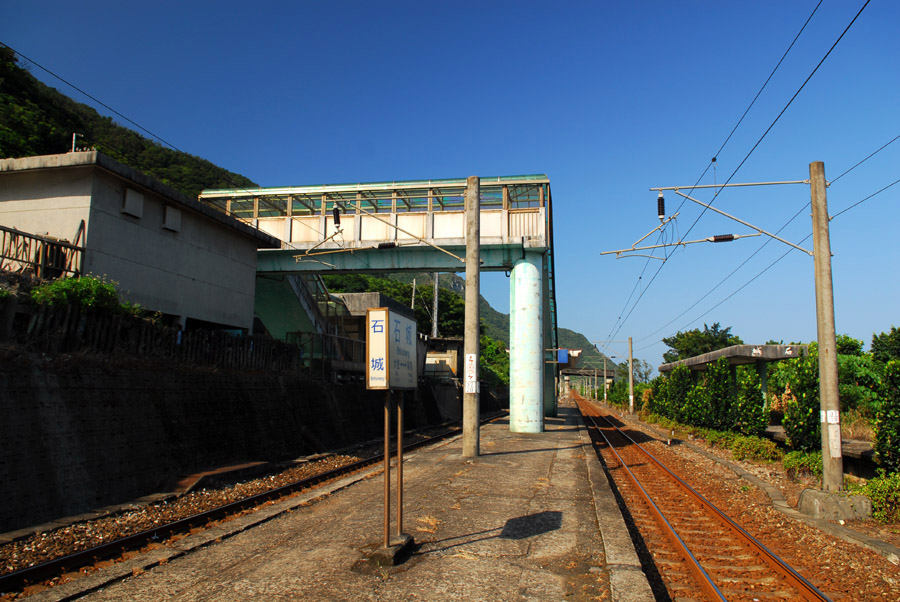
Shihcheng Station platform

== History ==
The station was opened on 1 May 1953.

== See also ==
- List of railway stations in Taiwan
