= LYIT =

LYIT may refer to:

- Lan Yang Institute of Technology in Yilan County, Taiwan
- Letterkenny Institute of Technology in County Donegal, Ireland
