= 龜山 =

龜山, 龟山 or 亀山 may refer to:

- Guishan, Macheng, Hubei province, People's Republic of China
- Guishan District, district in northeastern Taoyuan City, Taiwan
- Guishan Island (Yilan), island in Toucheng Township, Yilan County, Taiwan
- Guishan railway station, railway station of the Taiwan Railways Administration Yilan line
- Gusan-dong
- Gusan Station, railway station on Line 6of the Seoul Subway
- Kameyama, Mie, Japan
