= Toucheng railway station =

Railway station in Taiwan

Toucheng 頭城車站
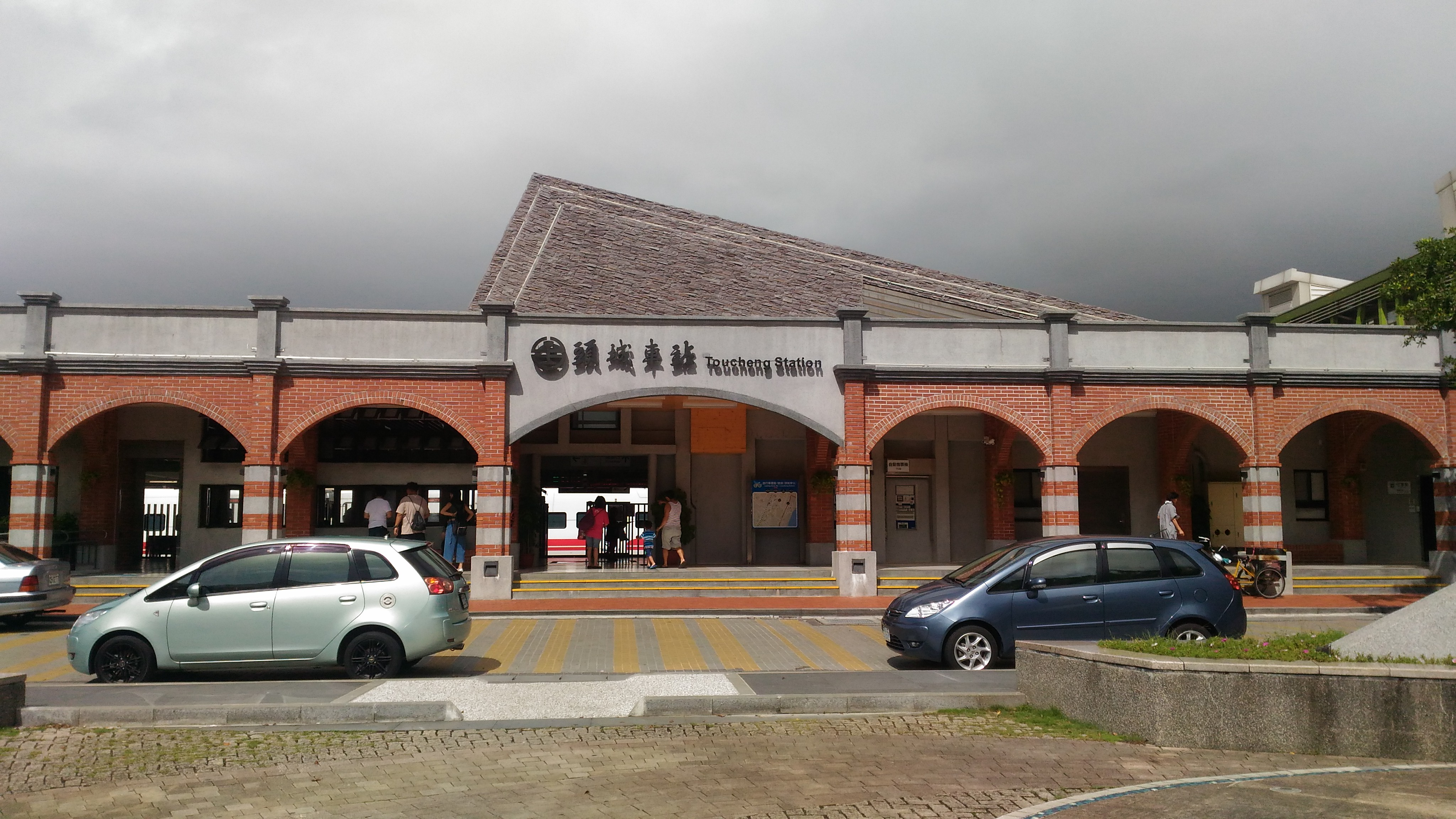

General information
- Location: Toucheng, Yilan County, Taiwan
- Coordinates: 24°51′32.43″N 121°49′20.58″E
- System: Train station
- Owner: Taiwan Railway Corporation
- Operator: Taiwan Railway Corporation
- Line: Eastern Trunk line
- Train operators: Taiwan Railway Corporation

History
- Opened: 25 April 1920

Passengers
- 2,206 daily (2024)

Services
Preceding station	Taiwan Railway	Following station
Wai'ao towards Badu	Eastern Trunk line	Dingpu towards Taitung
Location

Toucheng (Chinese: 頭城車站; pinyin: Tóuchéng Chēzhàn) is a railway station on the Taiwan Railway Yilan line located in Toucheng Township, Yilan County, Taiwan.

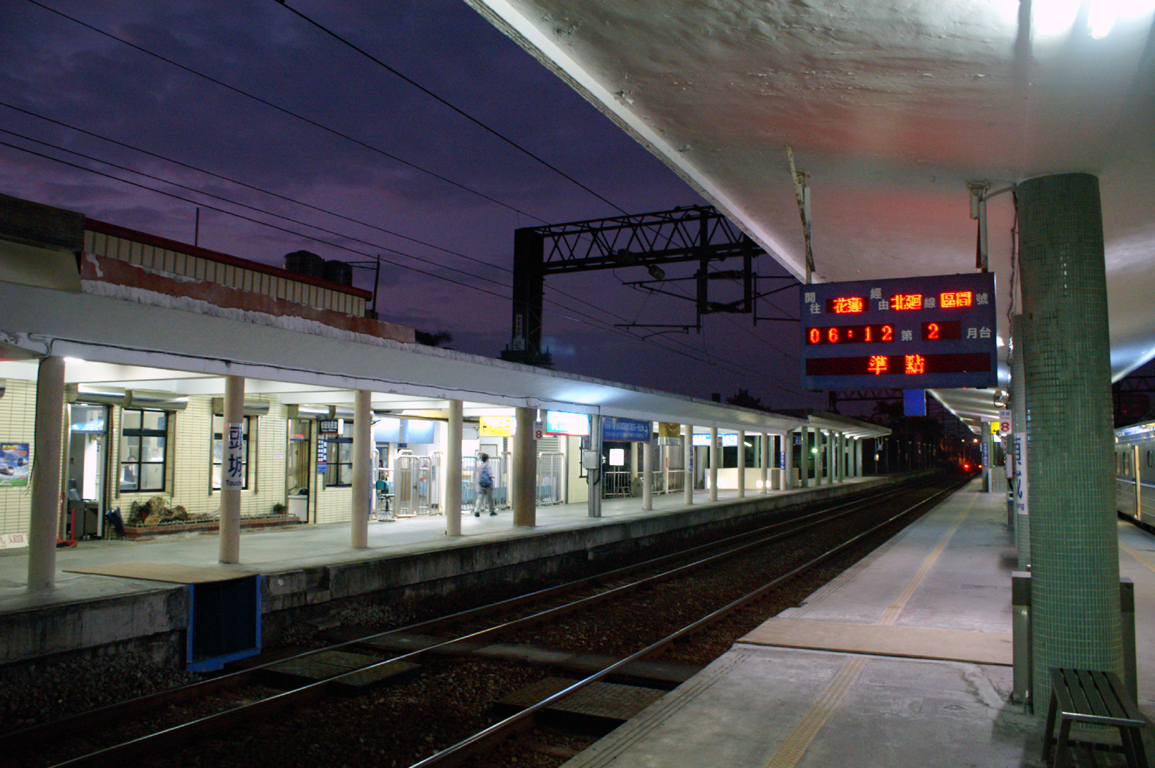
Toucheng station platform

== History ==
The station was opened on 25 April 1920 and fully renovated on 2016.

The station is a second-class station and manages five simple stations and greeting stations including Shicheng, Dali, Daxi, Guishan and Waiao'ao.

== Around the station ==
- Lan Yang Institute of Technology
- Lanyang Museum
- Lee Rong-chun Literary Museum
- Toucheng Old Street
- Wushi Harbor

== See also ==
- List of railway stations in Taiwan
