= Dingpu Station =

Dingpu Station may refer to following train stations in Taiwan:

- Dingpu Station (Yilan), a train station on the Yilan Line operated by the Taiwan Railway Administration in Toucheng, Yilan County
- Dingpu metro station, the western terminus of the Bannan line operated by the Taipei Metro in New Taipei City
