= Wai'ao railway station =

Railway station in Yilan County, Taiwan

Wai'ao Station 外澳車站
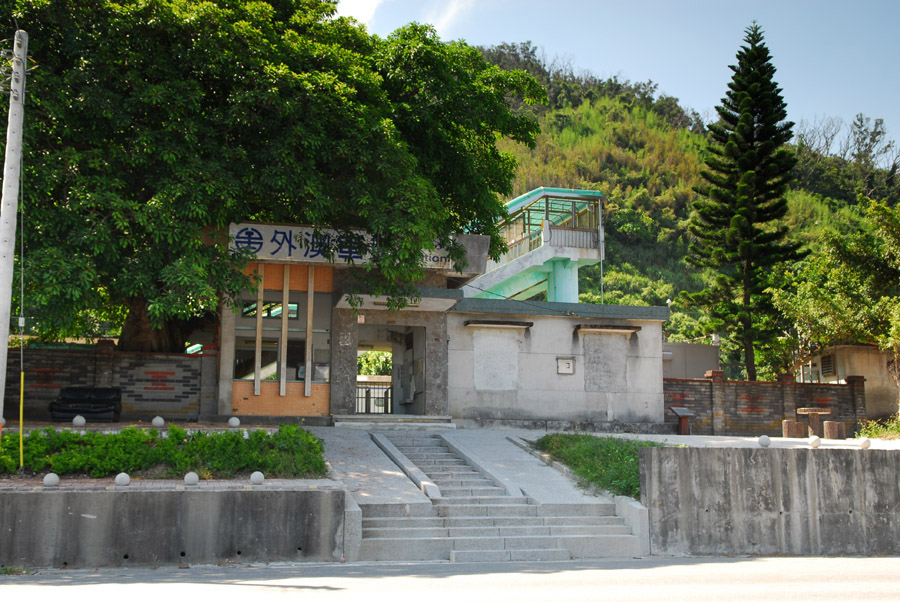

General information
- Location: Toucheng, Yilan County, Taiwan
- Coordinates: 24°53′1.7″N 121°50′44.7″E
- System: Train station
- Owner: Taiwan Railway Corporation
- Operator: Taiwan Railway Corporation
- Line: Eastern Trunk line
- Train operators: Taiwan Railway Corporation

History
- Opened: 10 December 1920

Passengers
- 240 daily (2024)

Services
Preceding station	Taiwan Railway	Following station
Guishan towards Badu	Eastern Trunk line	Toucheng towards Taitung
Location

Wai-ao (Chinese: 外澳車站; pinyin: Wài'ào Chēzhàn) is a railway station on the Taiwan Railway Yilan line located in Toucheng Township, Yilan County, Taiwan.

== History ==
The station was opened on 10 December 1920.

== See also ==
- List of railway stations in Taiwan
