= Sicheng railway station =

Railway station in Yilan County, Taiwan

Sicheng Station 四城車站
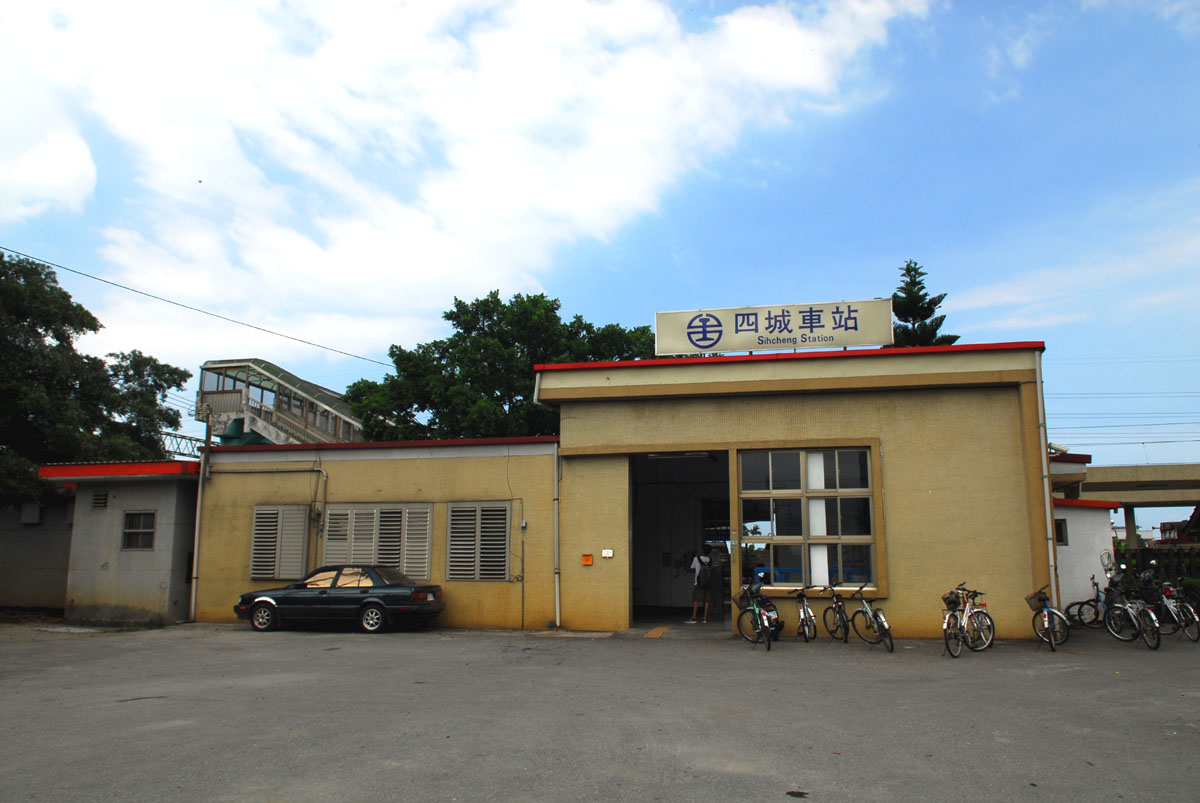

General information
- Location: Toucheng, Yilan County, Taiwan
- Coordinates: 24°47′10.74″N 121°45′45.96″E
- System: Train station
- Owner: Taiwan Railway Corporation
- Operator: Taiwan Railway Corporation
- Line: Eastern Trunk line
- Train operators: Taiwan Railway Corporation

History
- Opened: 25 February 1921

Passengers
- 266 daily (2024)

Services
Preceding station	Taiwan Railway	Following station
Jiaoxi towards Badu	Eastern Trunk line	Yilan towards Taitung
Location

Sicheng (Chinese: 四城車站; Hanyu Pinyin: Sìchéng Chēzhàn; Tongyong Pinyin: Sìhchéng Chejhàn) is a railway station of Taiwan Railway Yilan line located in Toucheng Township, Yilan County, Taiwan.

== History ==
The station was opened on 25 February 1921.

== See also ==
- List of railway stations in Taiwan
