= Jiaoxi railway station =

Railway station in Jiaoxi, Yilan County, Taiwan

Jiaoxi 礁溪車站
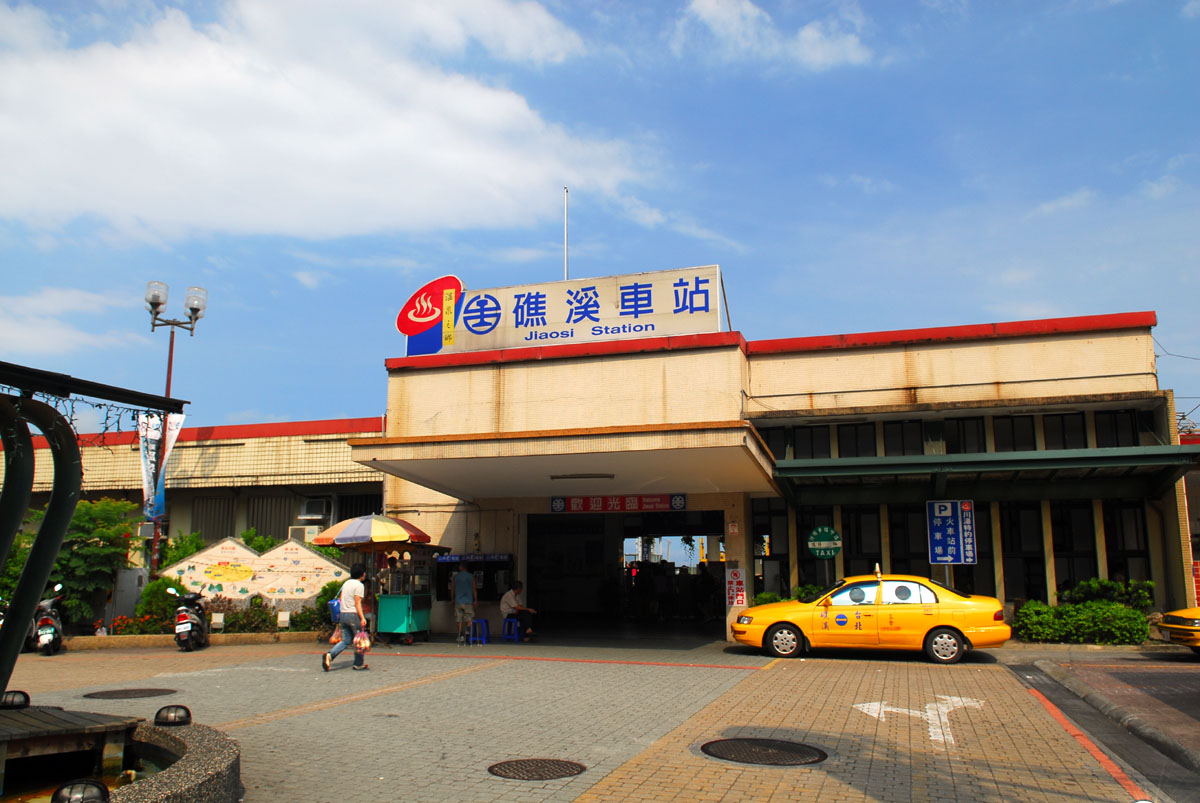

General information
- Location: Jiaoxi, Yilan County, Taiwan
- Coordinates: 24°49′37.74″N 121°46′31.14″E
- System: Train station
- Owner: Taiwan Railway Corporation
- Operator: Taiwan Railway Corporation
- Line: Eastern Trunk line
- Train operators: Taiwan Railway Corporation

History
- Opened: 15 November 1919

Passengers
- 3,633 daily (2024)

Services
Preceding station	Taiwan Railway	Following station
Dingpu towards Badu	Eastern Trunk line	Sicheng towards Taitung
Location

Jiaoxi (Chinese: 礁溪車站; Hanyu Pinyin: Jiāoxī Chēzhàn; Tongyong Pinyin: Jiaosi Chezhàn) is a railway station on the Taiwan Railway Yilan line. It is located in Jiaoxi Township, Yilan County, Taiwan.

== History ==
The station opened on 15 November 1919.

The station has been sister stations with Izu-Nagaoka Station in Japan since 4 November 2020.

== Around the station ==
- Fo Guang University
- Wufengqi Waterfall

== See also ==
- List of railway stations in Taiwan
