= Toucheng Leisure Farm =

Farm in Toucheng, Yilan County, Taiwan

Toucheng Leisure Farm 頭城農場
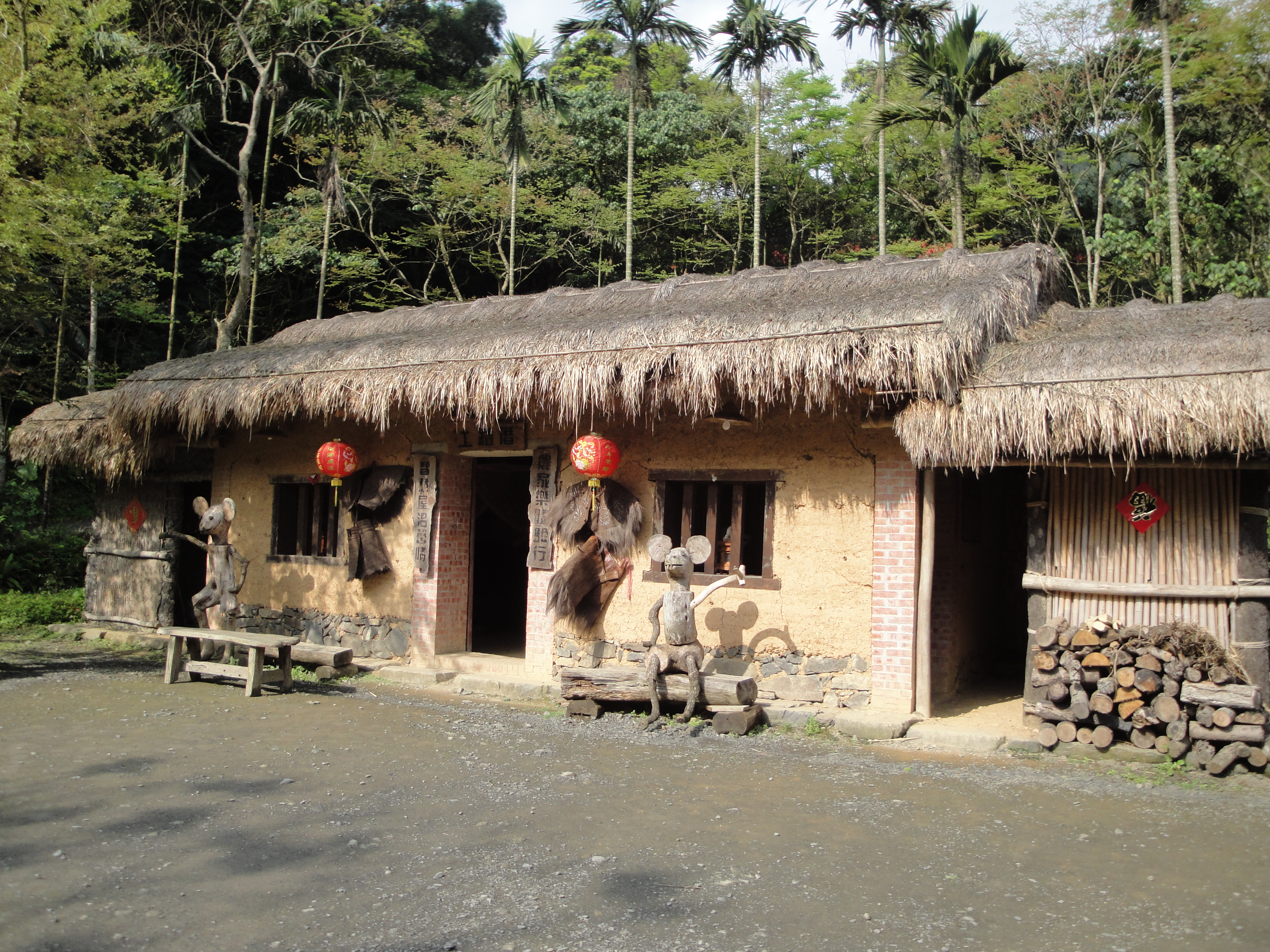
- Town/City: Toucheng, Yilan County, Taiwan
- Coordinates: 24°54′26.2″N 121°51′00.2″E
- Established: 1979
- Area: 110 ha (270 acres)
- Website: Official website

The Toucheng Leisure Farm (traditional Chinese: 頭城農場; simplified Chinese: 头城农场; pinyin: Tóuchéng Nóngchǎng) is a recreational farm in Toucheng Township, Yilan County, Taiwan.

== History ==
The farm was established in 1979.

== Architecture ==
The farm spreads over an area of 120 hectares. It features the main farmhouses and rice culture area. It has accommodation for 500 guests.

== Transportation ==
The farm is accessible by walking distance west from Guishan Station of Taiwan Railway.

== See also ==
- List of tourist attractions in Taiwan
