= Wushi Harbor =

Harbor in Toucheng, Yilan County, Taiwan

Wushi Harbor 烏石漁港
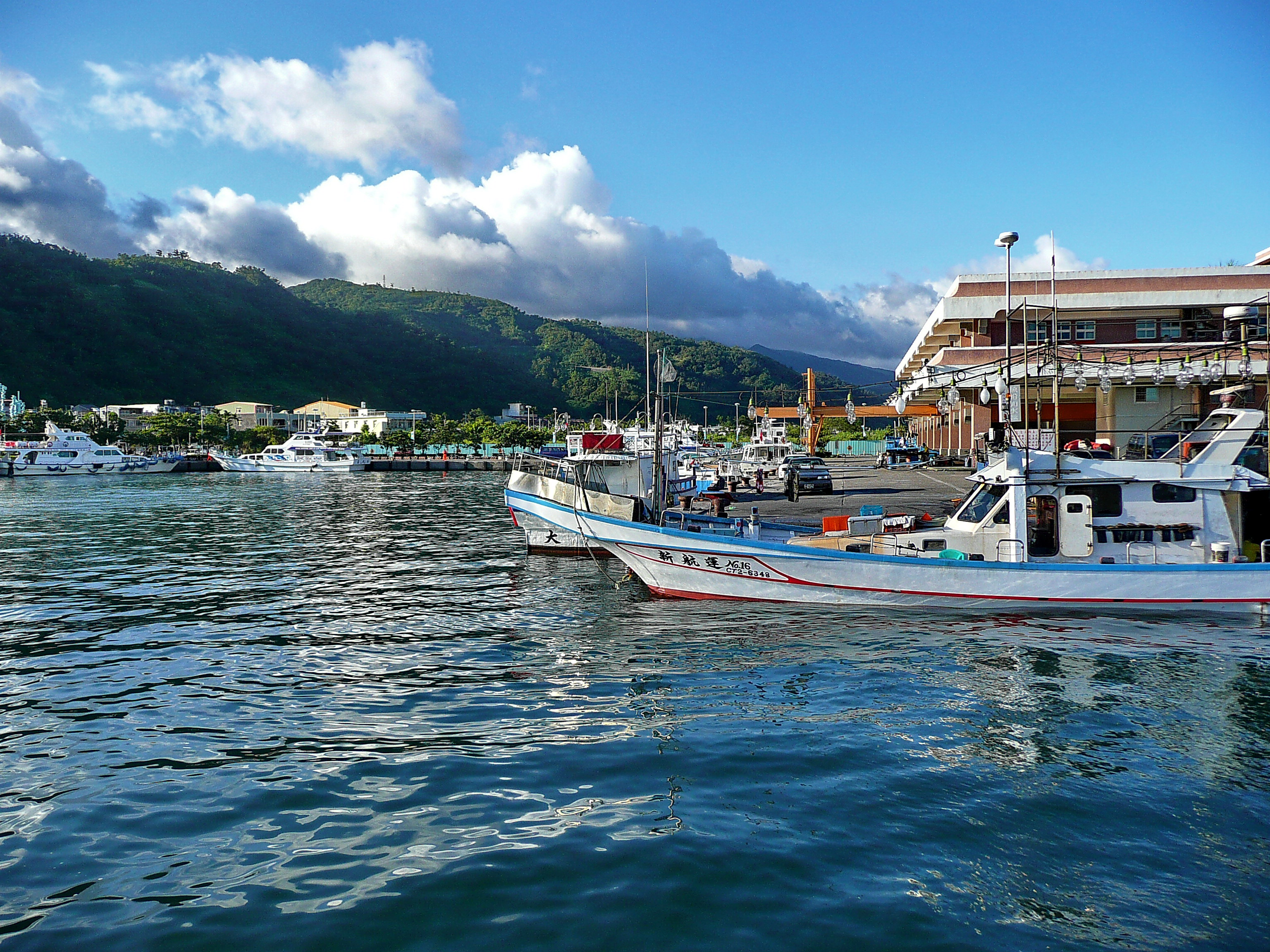
- Interactive map of Wushi Harbor 烏石漁港
- Location in Taiwan

Location
- Location: Toucheng, Yilan County, Taiwan
- Coordinates: 24°52′04.0″N 121°50′15.8″E

Details
- Opened: 1826
- Type of harbour: harbor

The Wushi Harbor (traditional Chinese: 烏石漁港; simplified Chinese: 乌石渔港; pinyin: Wūshí Yúgǎng) is a harbor in Toucheng Township, Yilan County, Taiwan.

== History ==
The harbor was inaugurated in 1826. It used to be the commercial hub for cargo ships entering and leaving the area during Qing Dynasty. In 19th century, there has been many sedimentation on the harbor seabed. With addition to the opening of Yilan Line railway, the harbor became less popular. After the year 2000, the Executive Yuan designated the harbor area as park and cultural zone.

== Destinations ==
- Guishan Island

== Architecture ==
The harbor features tourist information center, fish market etc. The Lanyang Museum is also located nearby the area.

== Transportation ==
The harbor is accessible within walking distance north of Toucheng Station of Taiwan Railway. It is also accessible by bus from Taipei by taking Kuo-Kuang bus 1877 arriving in front of Wushi Port.

== See also ==
- Transportation in Taiwan
