= Daxi railway station =

Railway station in Yilan County, Taiwan

Daxi Station 大溪車站
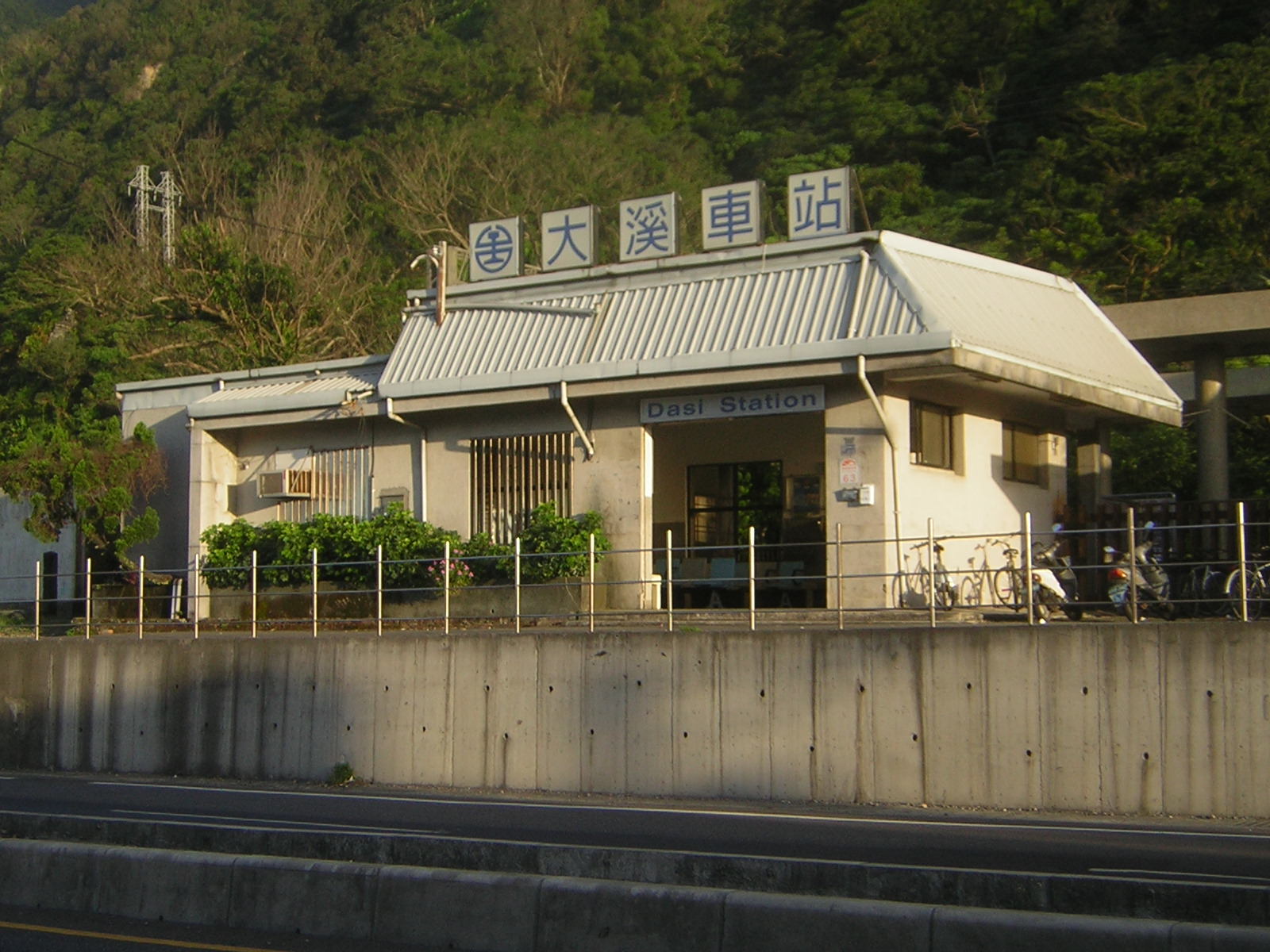

General information
- Location: Toucheng, Yilan County, Taiwan
- Coordinates: 24°56′19.3″N 121°53′23.4″E
- System: Train station
- Owner: Taiwan Railway Corporation
- Operator: Taiwan Railway Corporation
- Line: Eastern Trunk line
- Train operators: Taiwan Railway Corporation

History
- Opened: 10 December 1920

Passengers
- 398 daily (2024)

Services
Preceding station	Taiwan Railway	Following station
Dali towards Badu	Eastern Trunk line	Guishan towards Taitung
Location

Daxi (Chinese: 大溪車站; pinyin: Dàxī Chēzhàn) is a railway station on the Taiwan Railway (TR) Yilan line located in Daxi Village, Toucheng Township, Yilan County, Taiwan.

== Structure ==
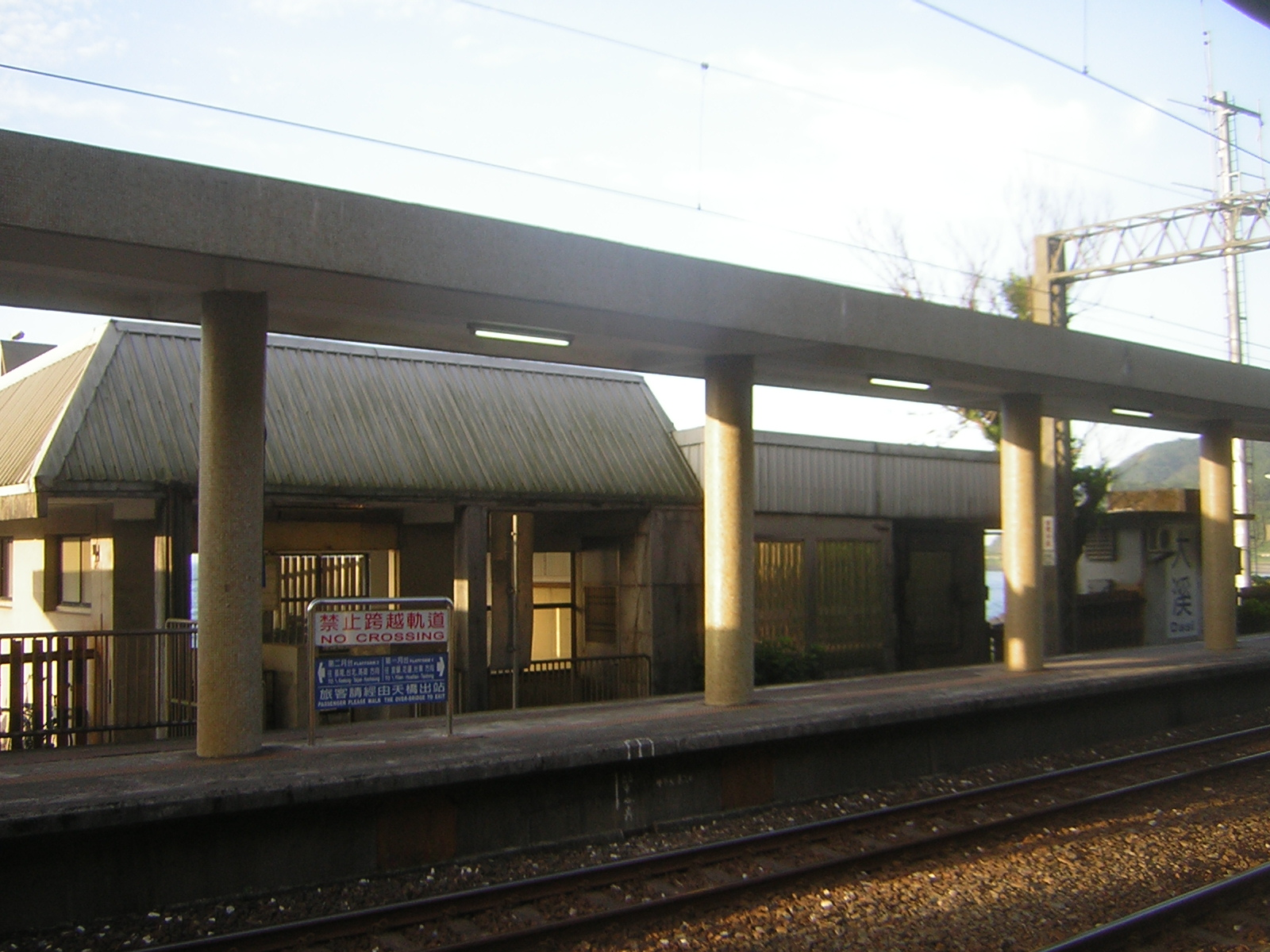
Daxi Station platform

- Two side platforms: Platform 1 is for the clockwise route (順行) surrounding Taiwan Island (going south from this station towards Yilan and Hualien), while Platform 2 is for the counterclockwise route (逆行) (going north towards Taipei and Keelung).
- The two platforms are connected with a footbridge.

== Service ==
- Only electric multiple units (EMUs) stop here.

== History ==
- Founded on 10 December 1920

== Nearby landmarks ==
- Outer Daxi Road (part of the Northern Seaside Highway, also known as Taiwan Highway Route 2)
- Inner Daxi Road (part of Yilan County Highway Route 1), leads to Shuangxi District, New Taipei City, Taiwan
- Pacific Ocean
- Honeymoon Bay

== See also ==
- List of railway stations in Taiwan
