= Lee Rong-chun Literary Museum =

Museum in Toucheng, Yilan County, Taiwan

- 李榮春文學館
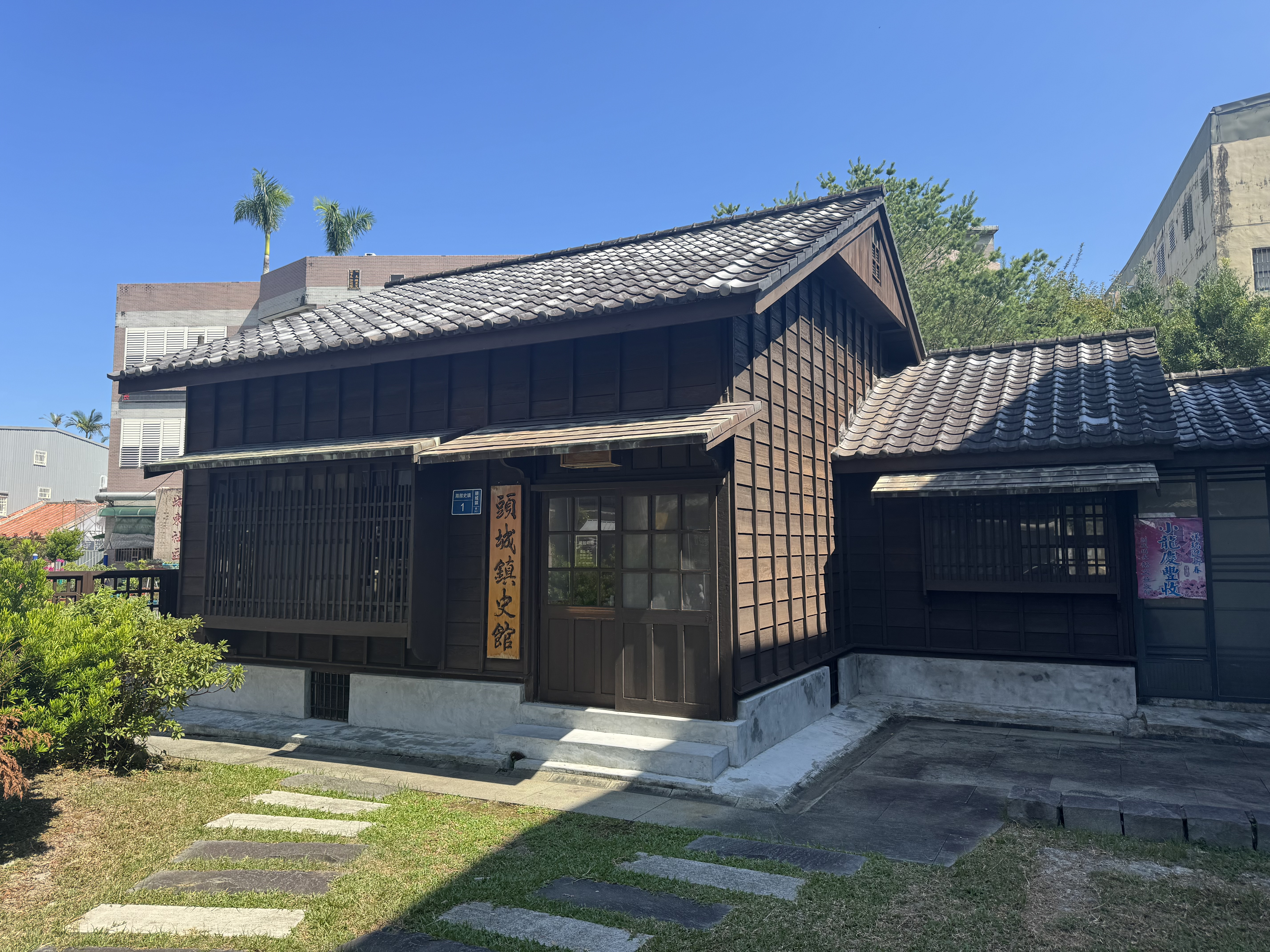
- Established: 2009
- Location: Toucheng, Yilan County, Taiwan
- Coordinates: 24°51′33.8″N 121°49′29.2″E
- Type: museum

The Lee Rong-chun Literary Museum (traditional Chinese: 李榮春文學館; simplified Chinese: 李荣春文学馆; pinyin: Lǐ Róngchūn Wénxué Guǎn) is a museum in Toucheng Township, Yilan County, Taiwan.

== History ==
The museum building used to be the principal's dormitory of Toucheng Elementary School. The building was then declared a historical building by Yilan County Government. Originally it was converted into the Toucheng Township History Hall by the Cultural Affairs Bureau of the county government. It was then converted into Lee Rong-chun Literary Museum in 2009.

== Architecture ==
The museum building is a Japanese architecture-style building.

== See also ==
- List of museums in Taiwan
