= Lanyang Museum =

Museum in Toucheng, Yilan County, Taiwan

- 蘭陽博物館
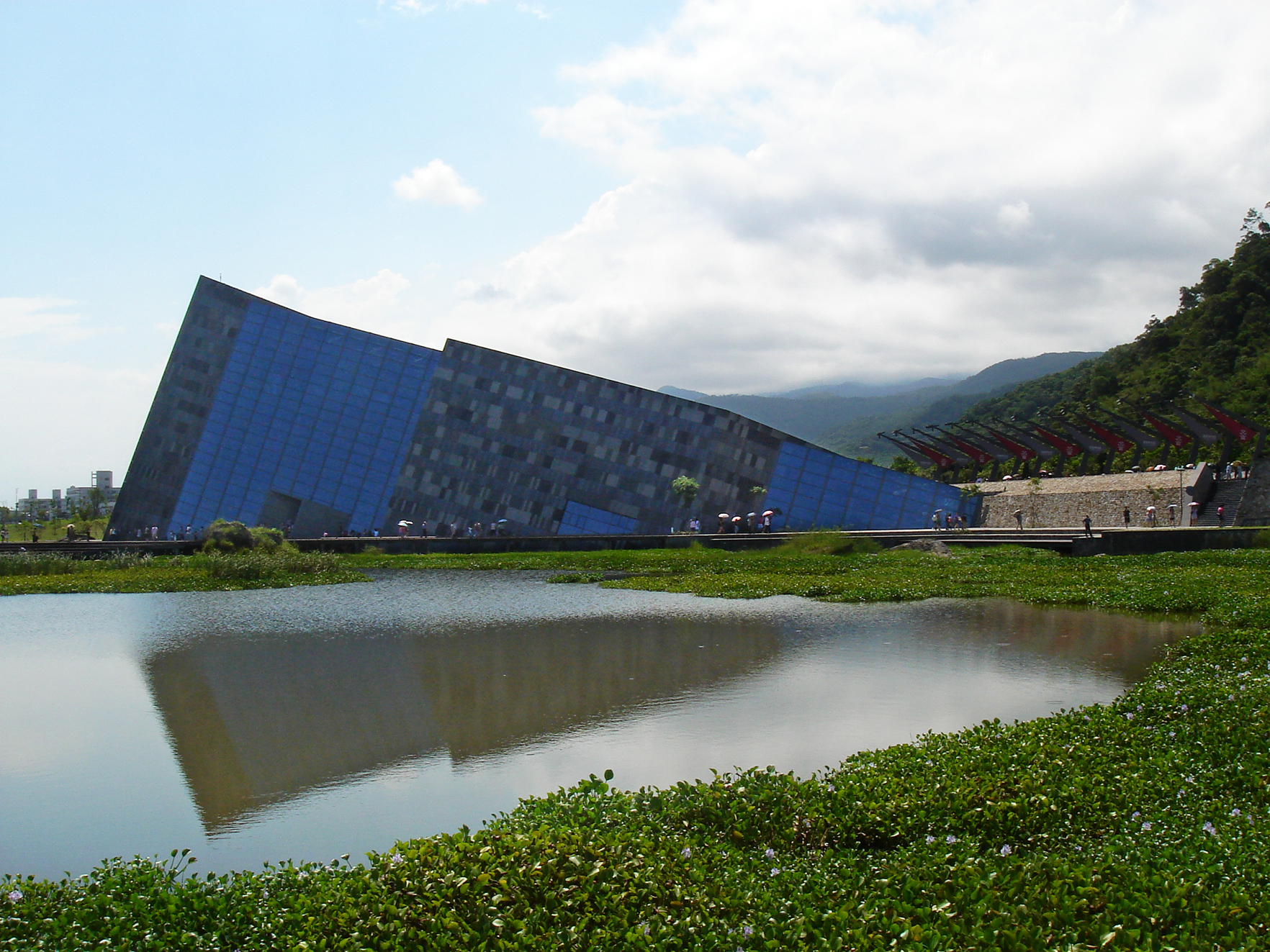
- Established: 16 October 2010
- Location: Toucheng, Yilan County, Taiwan
- Coordinates: 24°52′07″N 121°49′57″E
- Type: museum
- Architect: Artech
- Website: Official website

The Lanyang Museum (LYM; traditional Chinese: 蘭陽博物館; simplified Chinese: 兰阳博物馆; pinyin: Lányáng Bówùguǎn) is a museum about the local area in Toucheng Township, Yilan County, Taiwan.

== History ==
=== Engineering ===
In 1989, local Yilan personnel proposed the establishment of Kailan Museum. In December 1992, Yilan County Government established the Museum Preparatory and Planning Committee and the official name of the museum was chosen to be Lanyang Museum. The museum location was chosen to be near Wushi Harbor area in Toucheng Township. In September 1994, the Yilan County Government appointed National Museum of Natural Science and Building and Planning Research Foundation of National Taiwan University to form the planning team to implement Lanyang Museum Overall Development and Planning Research which was completed in 1995. In March 1999, the Lanyang Museum Preparatory Office was established. Artech architecture was awarded the design and construction for the museum in April 2000.

=== Procurement ===
In October 2001, the Museum section of Cultural Affairs Bureau of Yilan County Government handed over 1,924 artifacts to the museum, followed by Wangye Boat, Bozai Boat and tri-wheeler in a ceremony held at the lobby of Cultural Affairs Bureau building of the county government in January 2003.

=== Construction ===
The museum groundbreaking ceremony was held on 31 July 2004 at Wushi Harbor and construction began on 2 August 2004 and it began its first stage of opening on 18 May 2010 where only group visits made by advance reservations were accepted. The museum was finally opened officially to public on 16 October 2010.

== Architecture ==
The museum building was designed by a team led by Kris Yao those design was inspired by the cuestas commonly seen along Beiguan Coast. The museum adopts the geometric shapes of the cuestas where the roof protrudes from the ground at an angle of 20 degrees meeting a wall which rises from the ground at an angle of 70 degrees. Thus the building emerges from the ground in a similar fashion to those cuestas.

== Exhibition ==
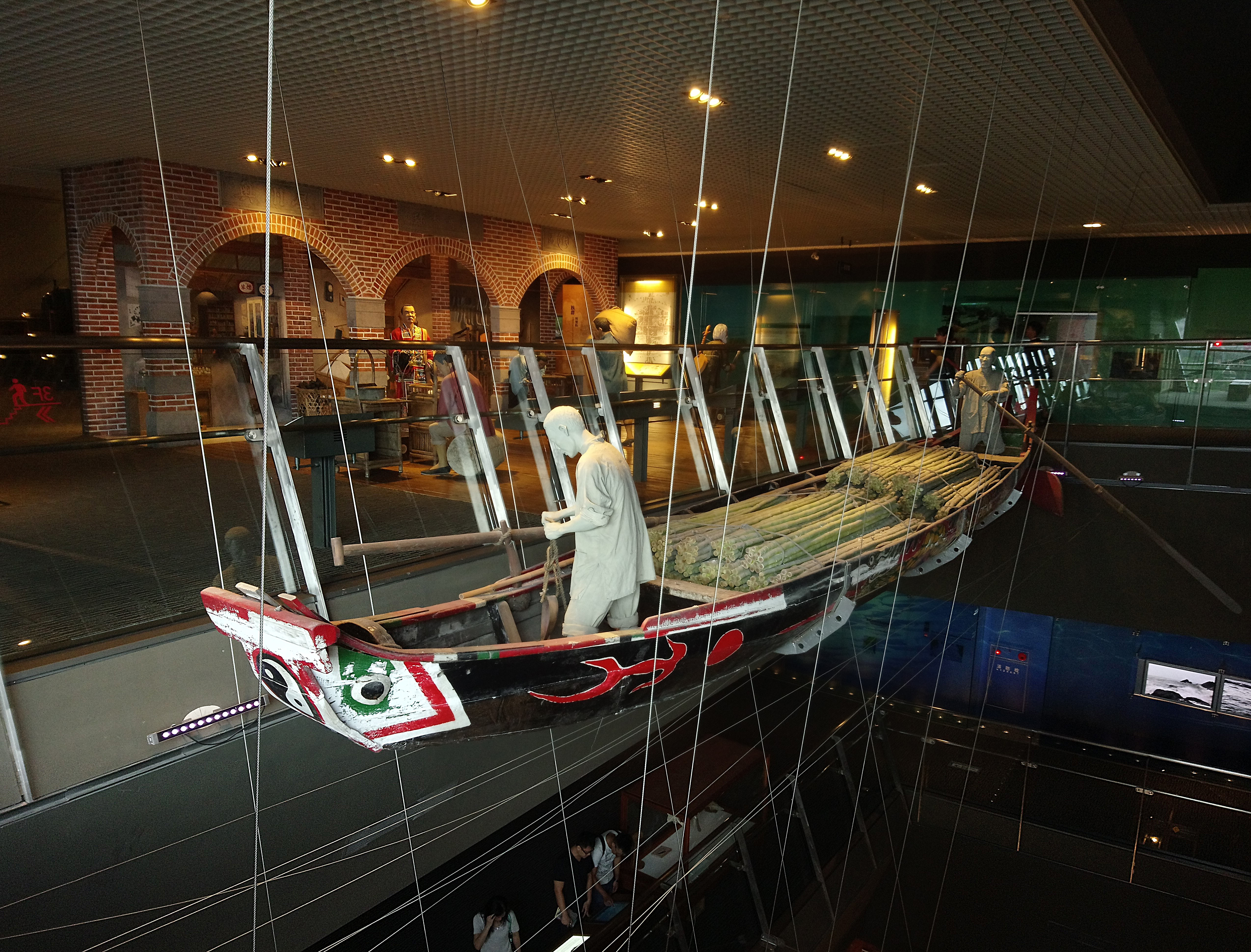
Exhibit of a model of the sampan

The museum features exhibits showcasing the topography of Yilan, including the mountains, the plains, and the sea.

== Transportation ==
The museum is accessible within walking distance northeast from Toucheng Station of Taiwan Railway.

== See also ==
- List of museums in Taiwan
