= Lan Yang Institute of Technology =

College in Toucheng, Yilan County, Taiwan

- 蘭陽技術學院
- Former names: Fushin Junior College of Technology; Fushin Institute of Technology
- Motto: Loyalty, Diligence, Honesty and Simplicity
- Type: private college
- Established: March 1966
- Founders: Tsia Tian-lin
- President: Lin Shu-li
- Vice-president: Liu Chien-liang
- Students: 0
- Location: Toucheng, Yilan County, Taiwan; 24.8686°N 121.8179°E
- Website: Official website

Lan Yang Institute of Technology
- Traditional Chinese: 蘭陽技術學院
Transcriptions
Standard Mandarin
- Hanyu Pinyin: Lányáng Jìshù Xuéyuàn
Southern Min
- Hokkien POJ: Lân-iông Ki-su̍t Ha̍k-īⁿ

Lan Yang Institute of Technology (LYIT; Chinese: 蘭陽技術學院; Pe̍h-ōe-jī: Lân-iông Ki-su̍t Ha̍k-īⁿ) is a private college in Toucheng Township, Yilan County, Taiwan.

== History ==
LYIT was originally established as Fushin Junior College of Technology in March 1966. In 1983, it was renamed Fushin Institute of Technology. In 2001, the school was upgraded to Lan Yang Institute of Technology.

In 2018, the university had a concern on the low admission to their school, which resulted in the planned closures of many of its departments.

== Faculties ==
- Department of Digital Marketing
- Department of Fashion Beauty Design
- Department of Health and Leisure Management
- Department of Hospitality Management
- Department of Interior Design
- Department of Mechatronics Engineering
- Department of Tourism and Travel Management

== Transportation ==
The campus is accessible within walking distance northwest from Toucheng Station of Taiwan Railway.

== See also ==
- List of universities in Taiwan
