= Guishan railway station =

Railway station in Yilan County, Taiwan

Guishan Station 龜山車站
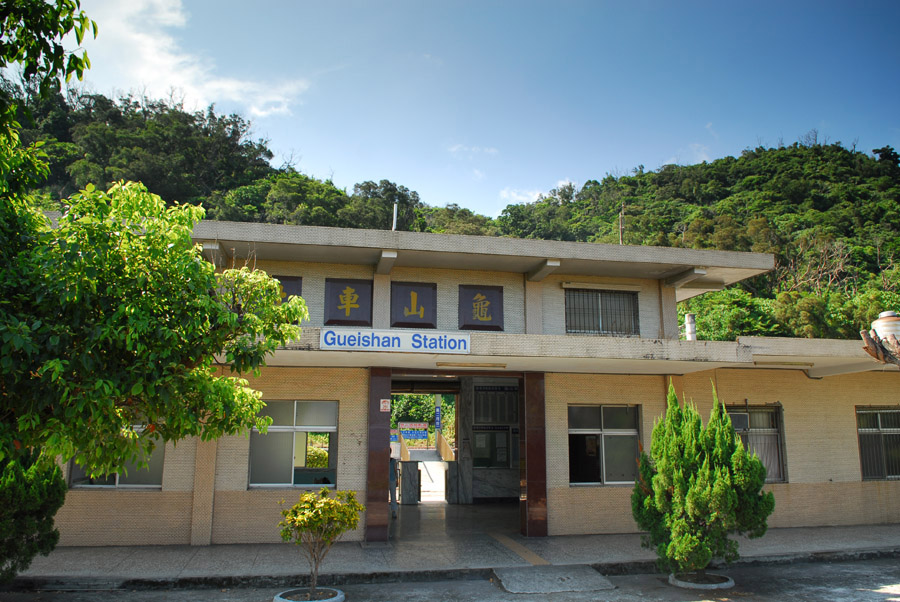

General information
- Location: Toucheng, Yilan County, Taiwan
- Coordinates: 24°54′17.6″N 121°52′08.0″E
- System: Train station
- Owner: Taiwan Railway Corporation
- Operator: Taiwan Railway Corporation
- Line: Eastern Trunk line
- Train operators: Taiwan Railway Corporation

History
- Opened: 10 December 1920

Passengers
- 183 daily (2024)

Services
Preceding station	Taiwan Railway	Following station
Daxi towards Badu	Eastern Trunk line	Wai'ao towards Taitung
Location

Guishan (Chinese: 龜山車站; pinyin: Guīshān Chēzhàn) is a railway station of the Taiwan Railway Yilan line located in Toucheng Township, Yilan County, Taiwan.

== History ==
The station was opened on 10 December 1920.

== Around the station ==
- Toucheng Leisure Farm

== See also ==
- List of railway stations in Taiwan
