= Yilan line =

Railway line in Taiwan

Overview
- Native name: 宜蘭線
- Owner: Taiwan Railway Corporation
- Termini: Badu; Su'ao
- Stations: 27

Service
- Type: Passenger/freight rail
- Operator(s): Taiwan Railway Corporation

History
- Opened: 1924-11-30

Technical
- Line length: 93.6 km (58.2 mi)
- Number of tracks: 2
- Track gauge: 3 ft 6 in (1,067 mm)
- Electrification: 25 kV/60 Hz catenary
- Operating speed: 150 km/h (93 mph)

The Yilan line (Chinese: 宜蘭線; pinyin: Yilán Xiàn; Pe̍h-ōe-jī: Gî-lân Soàⁿ) is the northern section of the Eastern line of Taiwan Railway in Taiwan. It has a length of 95 km.

== History ==
This railroad was completed in 1924 as the Giran-sen during Imperial Japanese rule over Taiwan. It was expanded to two tracks in the early 1980s.

In 2000, it was electrified between Badu and Luodong, while the remaining part was completed in 2003.

On 4 December 2020, a landslide buried a section of the line between Houtong and Ruifang Station in Ruifang District, resulting in rail service disruption along the line. Emergency work was carried out to remove the 10,000 m^{3} of debris and to restore the overhead line. On 14 December, the line was fully reopened for service.

== Stations ==
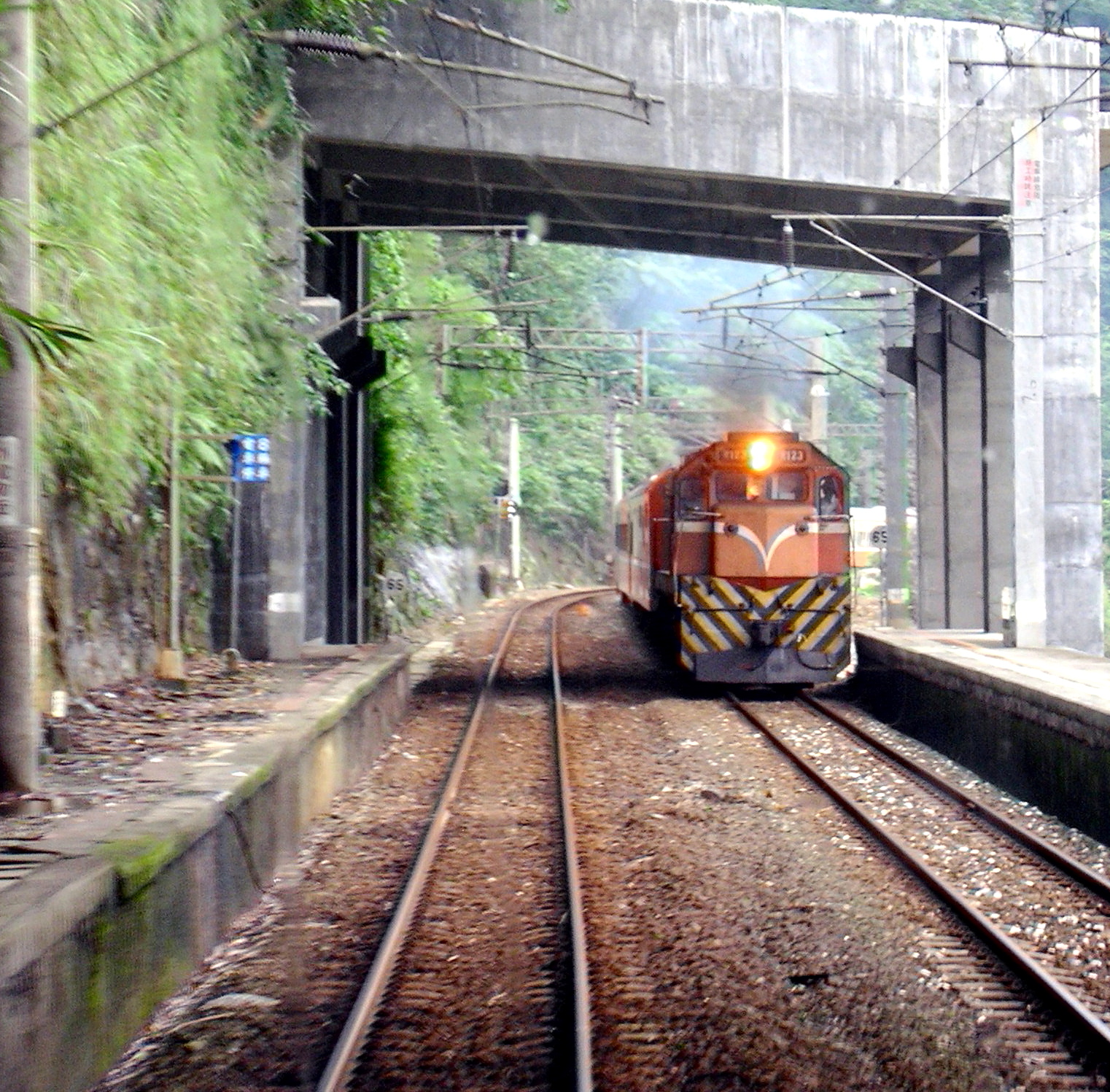
Train passing through the rural Sandiaoling Station

Name	Chinese	Taiwanese	Hakka	Transfers and notes	Location	
Badu	八堵	Peh-tó͘	Pat-tú	→ West Coast line	Nuannuan	Keelung
Nuannuan	暖暖	Loán-loán	Nôn-nôn		Nuannuan	Keelung
Sijiaoting	四腳亭	Sì-kha-têng	Si-kiok-thìn		Ruifang	New Taipei
Ruifang	瑞芳	Sūi-hong	Lui-fông	→ Shen'ao line	Ruifang	New Taipei
Houtong	猴硐	Kâu-tông	Heù-thung		Ruifang	New Taipei
Sandiaoling	三貂嶺	Sam-tiau-niá	Sâm-tiau-liâng	→ Pingxi line	Ruifang	New Taipei
Mudan	牡丹	Bó͘-tan	Meú-Tân		Shuangxi	New Taipei
Shuangxi	雙溪	Siang-khe	Sûng-hâi		Shuangxi	New Taipei
Gongliao	貢寮	Kòng-liâu	Kung-liàu		Gongliao	New Taipei
Fulong	福隆	Hok-liông	Fuk-lùng		Gongliao	New Taipei
Shicheng	石城	Chio̍h-siâⁿ	Sa̍k-sàng		Toucheng	Yilan; County
Dali	大里	Tāi-lí	Thai-lî		Toucheng	Yilan; County
Daxi	大溪	Tāi-khe	Thai-hâi		Toucheng	Yilan; County
Guishan	龜山	Ku-soaⁿ	Kûi-sân		Toucheng	Yilan; County
Wai'ao	外澳	Goā-ò	Ngoi-o		Toucheng	Yilan; County
Toucheng	頭城	Thâu-siâⁿ	Theù-sàng		Toucheng	Yilan; County
Dingpu	頂埔	Téng-po͘	Táng-phû		Toucheng	Yilan; County
Jiaoxi	礁溪	Ta-khe	Chiau-hâi		Jiaoxi	Yilan; County
Sicheng	四城	Sì-siâⁿ	Si-sàng		Jiaoxi	Yilan; County
Yilan	宜蘭	Gî-lân	Ngì-làn		Yilan	Yilan; County
Erjie	二結	Jī-kiat	Ngi-kiet		Wujie	Yilan; County
Zhongli	中里	Tiong-lí	Chûng-lî		Wujie	Yilan; County
Luodong	羅東	Lô-tong	Lò-tûng		Luodong	Yilan; County
Dongshan	冬山	Tang-soaⁿ	Tûng-sân		Dongshan	Yilan; County
Xinma	新馬	Sin-má	Sîn-mâ		Su'ao	Yilan; County
Su'aoxin	蘇澳新	So͘-ò Sin	Sû-o Sîn	→ North-link line	Su'ao	Yilan; County
Su'ao	蘇澳	So͘-ò	Sû-o		Su'ao	Yilan; County

- The Shen'ao line runs for both freight and passenger service.

== See also ==
- North-link line
- Taitung line
- South-link line
