= Dingpu railway station =

Railway station in Yilan County, Taiwan

Dingpu station 頂埔車站
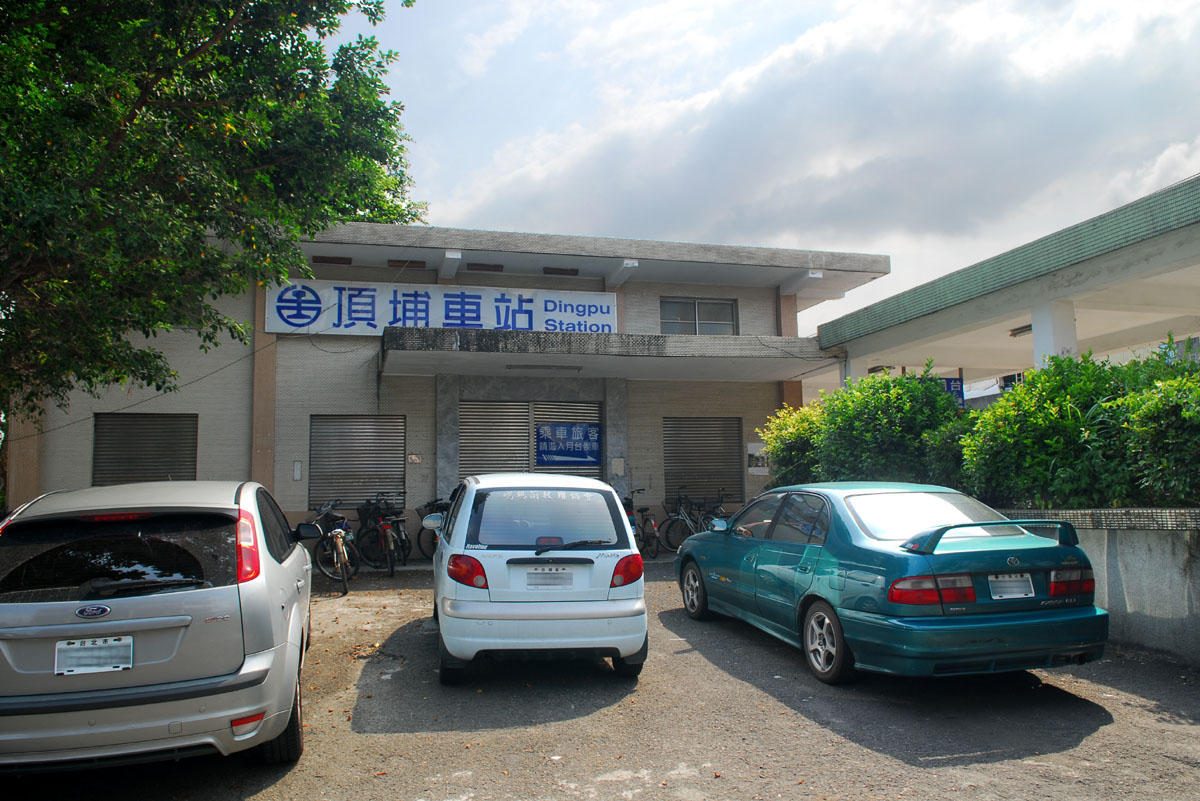

General information
- Location: Toucheng, Yilan County, Taiwan
- Coordinates: 24°50′37.98″N 121°48′32.40″E
- System: Train station
- Owner: Taiwan Railway Corporation
- Operator: Taiwan Railway Corporation
- Line: Eastern Trunk line
- Train operators: Taiwan Railway Corporation

History
- Opened: 1 May 1937

Passengers
- 1,295,466 daily (2024)

Services
Preceding station	Taiwan Railway	Following station
Toucheng towards Badu	Eastern Trunk line	Jiaoxi towards Taitung
Location

Dingpu (Chinese: 頂埔車站; pinyin: Dǐngpù Chēzhàn) is a railway station of Taiwan Railway Yilan line located at Toucheng Township, Yilan County, Taiwan. Dingpu Station began operations in 1937.

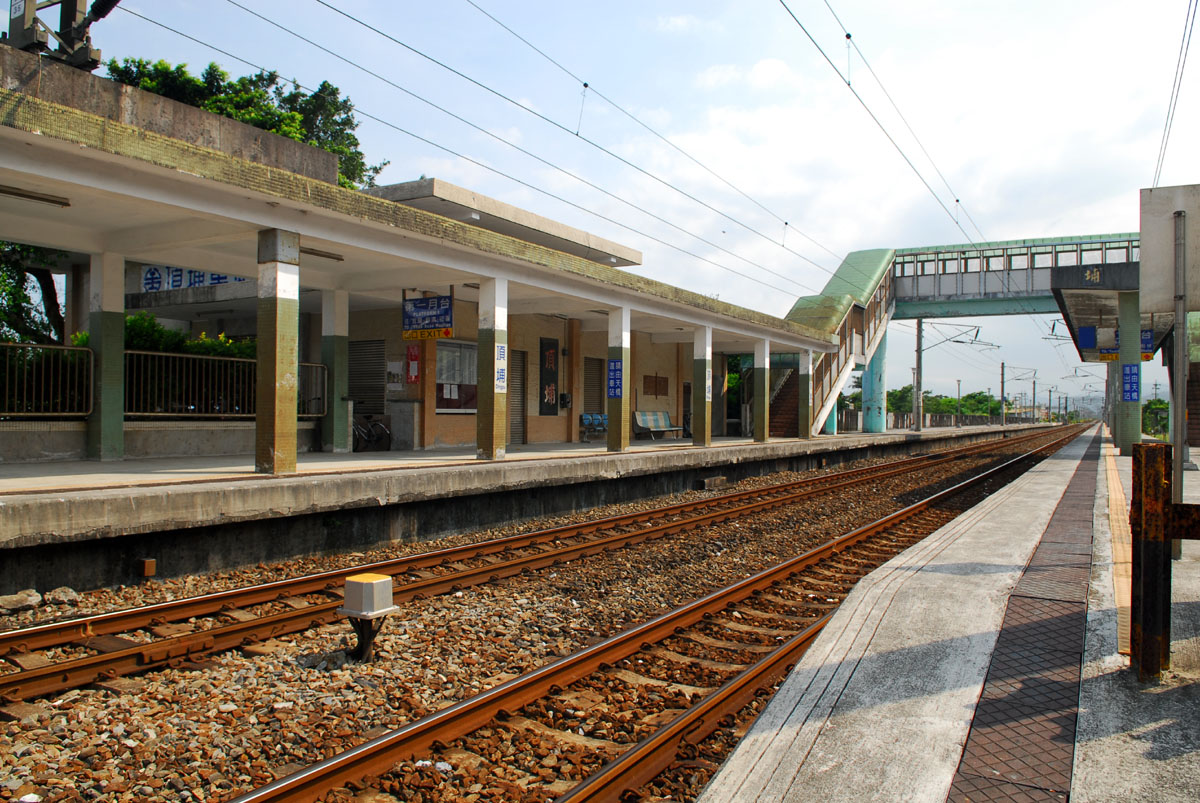
Dingpu station platform

== History ==
The station was opened on 1 May 1937.

== See also ==
- List of railway stations in Taiwan
