= Toucheng =

Urban township in Yilan County, Taiwan

Coordinates: 24°51′N 121°49′E

Toucheng Township 頭城鎮 Tōi
- Urban township
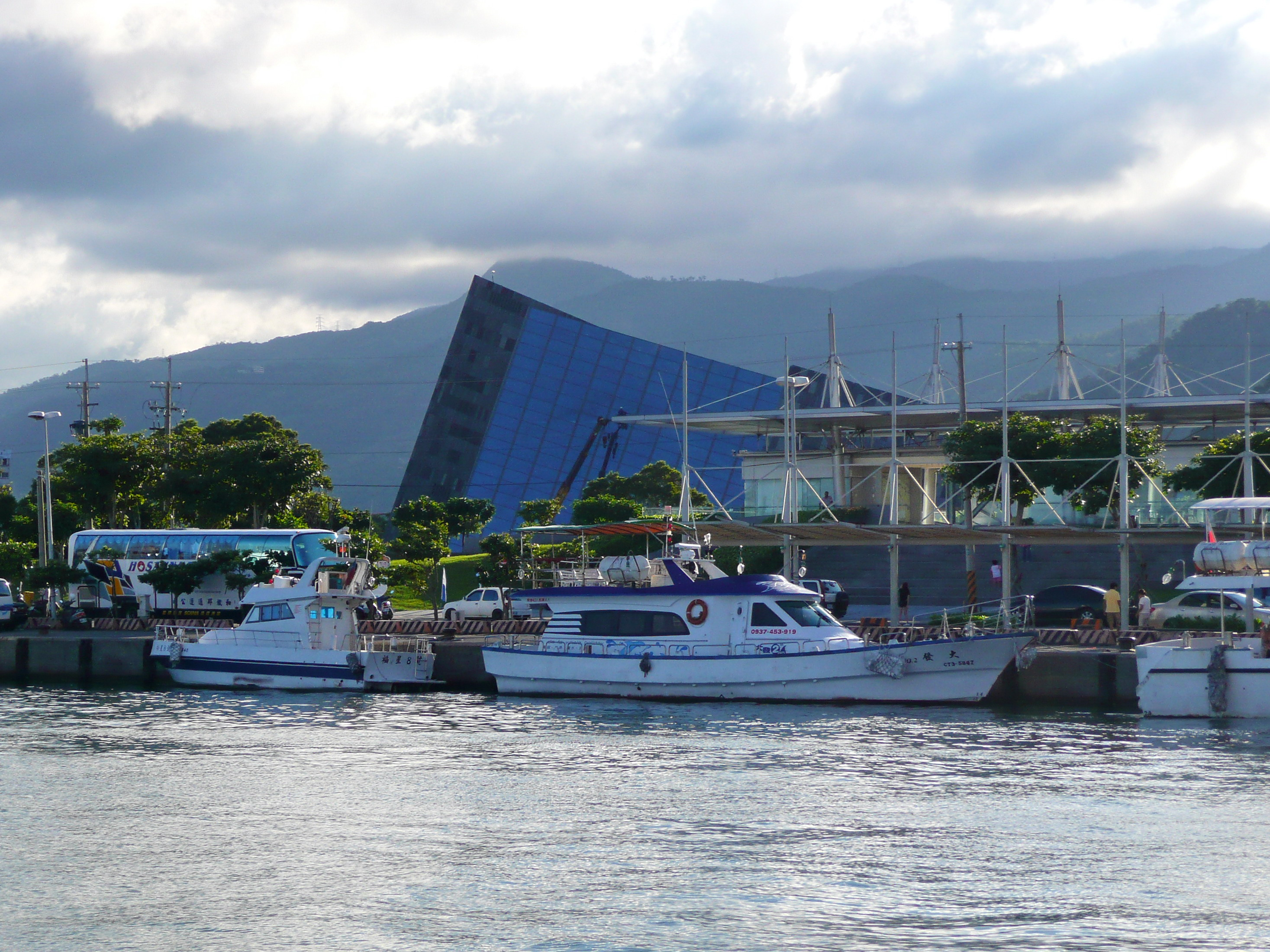
- Harbor in Toucheng Township

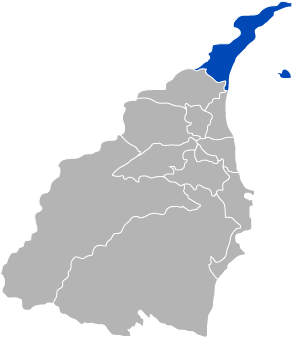
- Toucheng Township in Yilan County
- Country: Republic of China
- County: Yilan
- Urban villages (里): 25

Government
  - Mayor (鎮長): Tsao Qian-shun (曹乾舜)

Area
  - Total: 100.89 km^{2} (38.95 sq mi)

Population (September 2023)
  - Total: 28,334
  - Density: 280.84/km^{2} (727.37/sq mi)
- Time zone: UTC+8 (National Standard Time)
- Postal code: 261
- Website: toucheng.e-land.gov.tw (in Chinese)

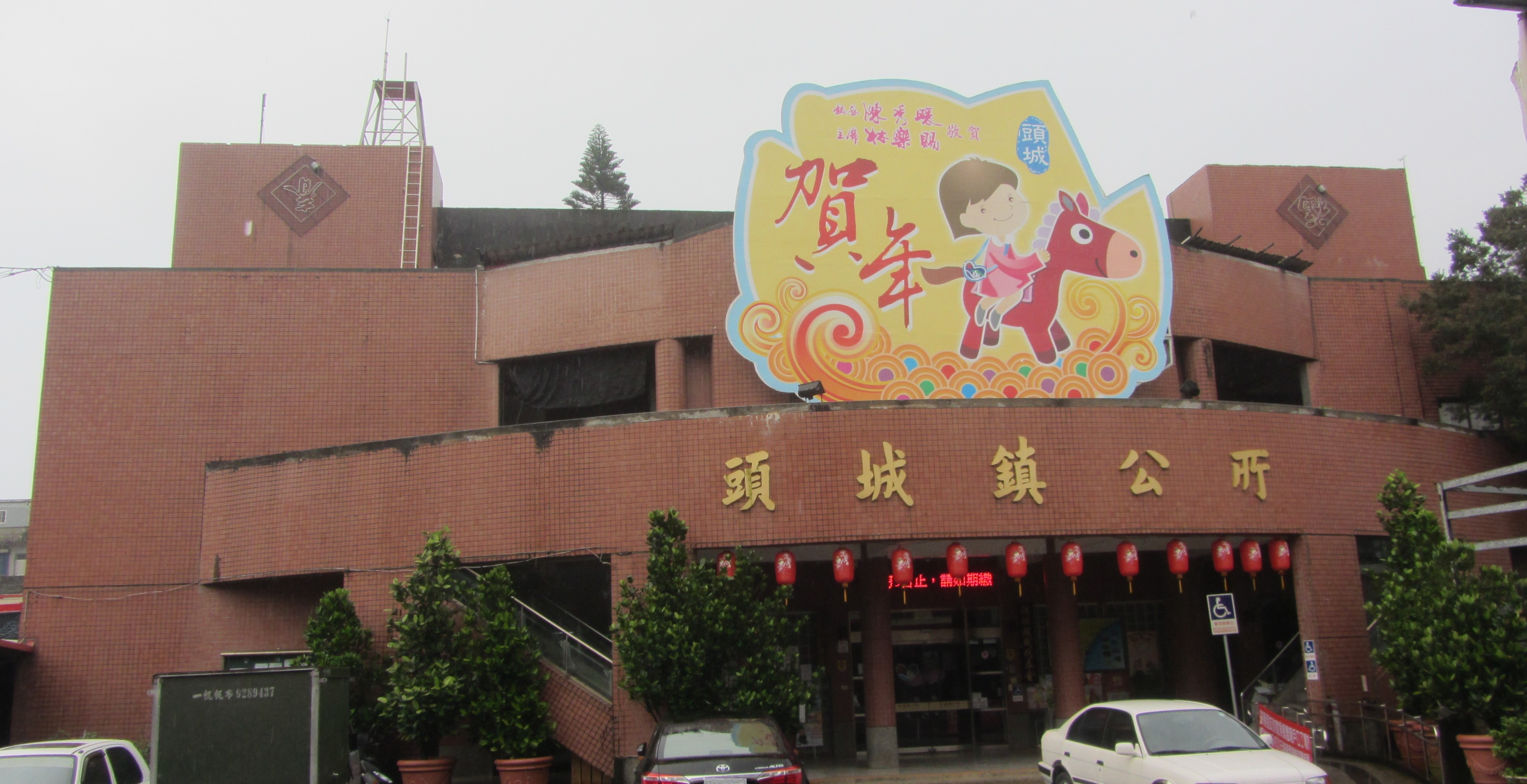
Toucheng Township Office

Toucheng Township (Chinese: 頭城鎮; pinyin: tóu chéng zhèn; Pe̍h-ōe-jī: Thâu-siâⁿ-tìn) is an urban township in Yilan County, Taiwan. The township includes Guishan Island and Guiluan Island in the Philippine Sea. The Senkaku Islands, known in Mandarin as the Diaoyu Islands, are claimed as part of the township.

== History ==
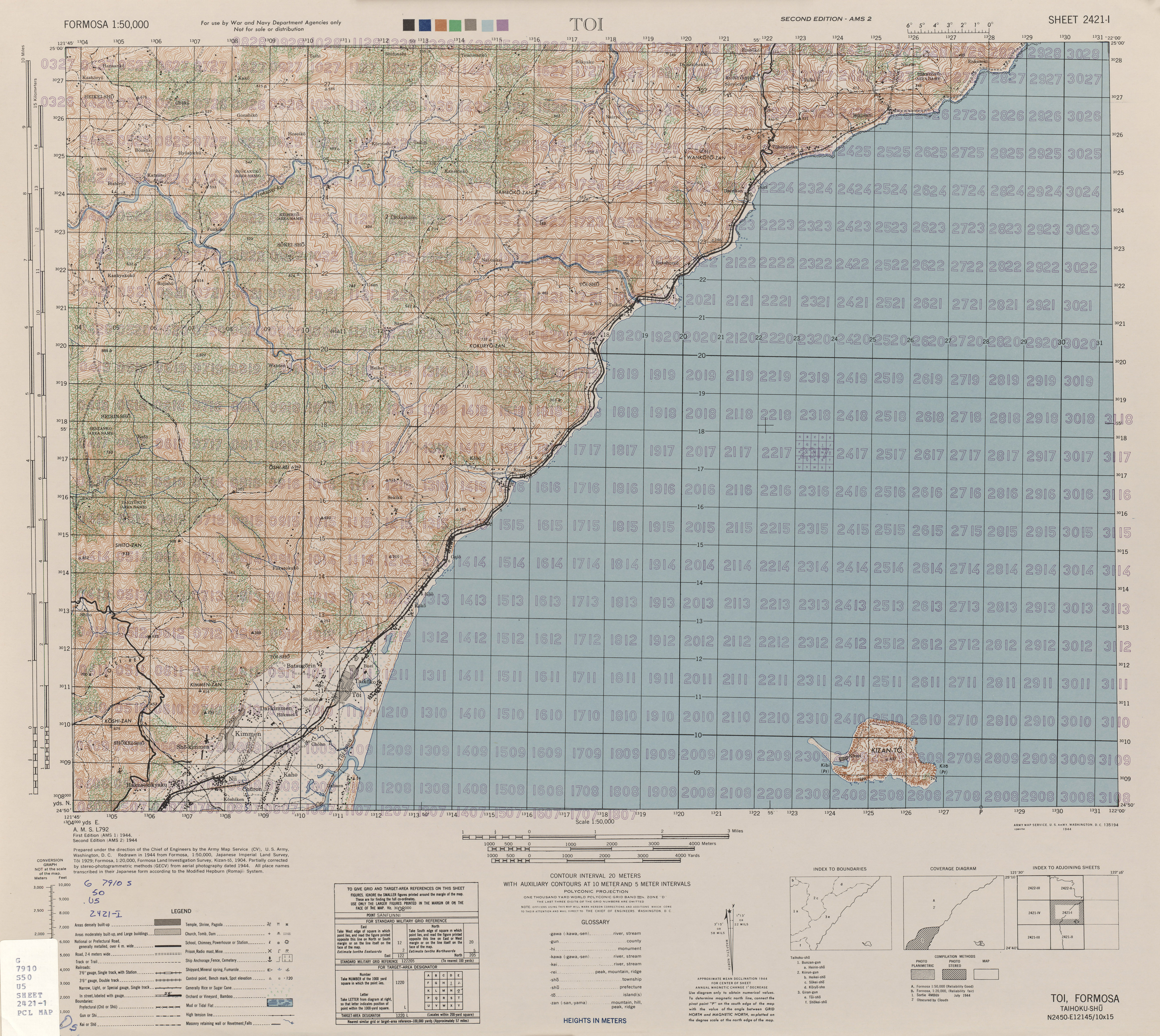
Map of Toucheng (labeled as Tōi) and surrounding area (1944)

Toucheng was formerly called Thau-ui (Chinese: 頭圍; Pe̍h-ōe-jī: Thâu-uî). Toucheng Township (頭城鄉) was established on 9 September 1946. Toucheng Township was upgraded to an urban township (頭城鎮) on 1 January 1948.

== Geography ==
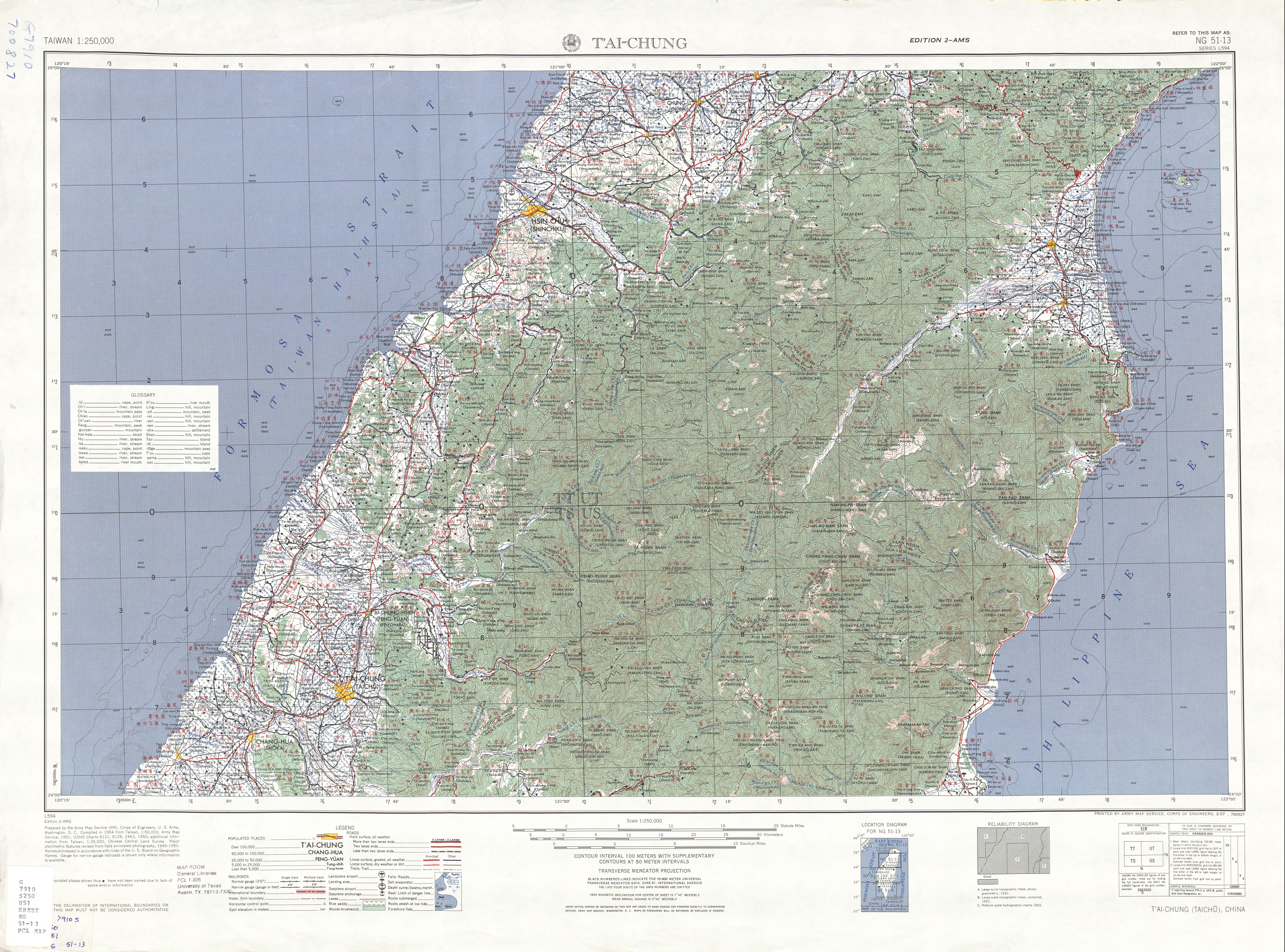
Map including Toucheng (labeled as T’ou-wei (Tōi) 頭圍) (1954)

- Area: 100.89 km^{2} (39 sq. mi.)
- Population: 28,334 people (September 2023)

== Administrative divisions ==
Toucheng includes twenty-five urban villages:

- Shicheng/Shihcheng (Shih-ch'eng-tzu, Sekijōshi, Tsio̍h-siânn; 石城里), Dali (Ta-li-chien, Dairikan, Tāi-lí-kán; 大里里, 大里簡), Guishan (Kuei-shan, Kīzan, Ku-suann; 龜山里), Daxi (Ta-ch'i, Taikei; 大溪里), Hexing (Ho-hsing, Gōkō; 合興里), Gengxin (更新里), Waiao (Wai-ao, Gaiō; 外澳里), Gangkou (Chiang-k'ou, Kōkō; 港口里), Wuying (武營里), Dakeng (大坑里), Chengtung (城東里), Chengbei (城北里), Chengxi (城西里), Chengnan (城南里), Zhuan (竹安里), Xinjian (新建里), Baya (拔雅里), Fucheng (福成里), Jinmian (Hsiao-chin-mien, Shō-kimmen; 金面里, 小金面), Jinying (金盈里), Dingpu (頂埔里), Xiapu (下埔里), Zhonglun (Chung-lun, Chūron; 中崙里) and Ercheng (二城里) Village.

== Education ==
- Lan Yang Institute of Technology

== Infrastructure ==
=== Submarine communication cables ===
Toucheng is one of the two cable landing points of Taiwan island (the other one is Fangshan). Four submarine communication cables, including APCN, APCN2, RNAL, and SEA-ME-WE 3, connect here.

== Tourist attractions ==
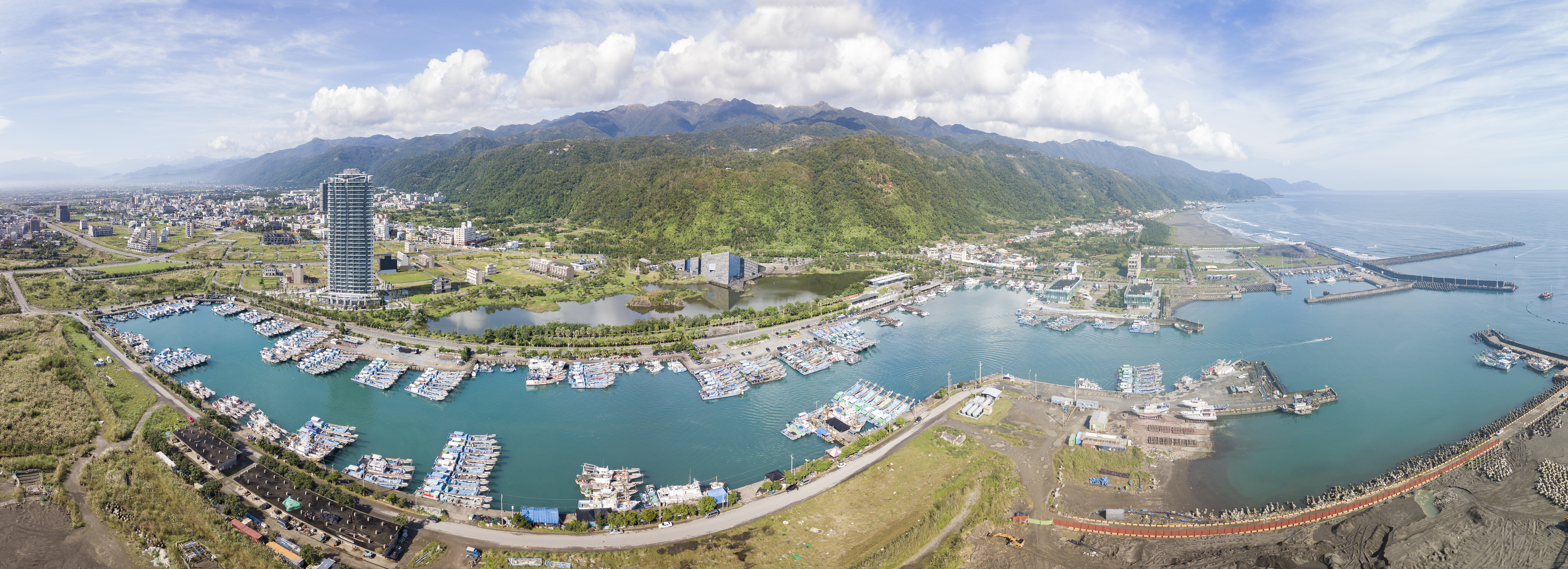
Aerial panorama of Wushi Harbour, including Lanyang Museum

The township has several fresh seafood restaurants and also black sand beach for surfing activities.

Several boat operators offer trips from the Wushi Harbour to Guishan Island and also for whale and dolphin watching.

The Juh-an River Bird sanctuary is another attraction of Toucheng.

Once the economic center of the area, the Ho-Ping street in Toucheng is one of the few unaltered and typical Qing dynasty Taiwanese urban structures.

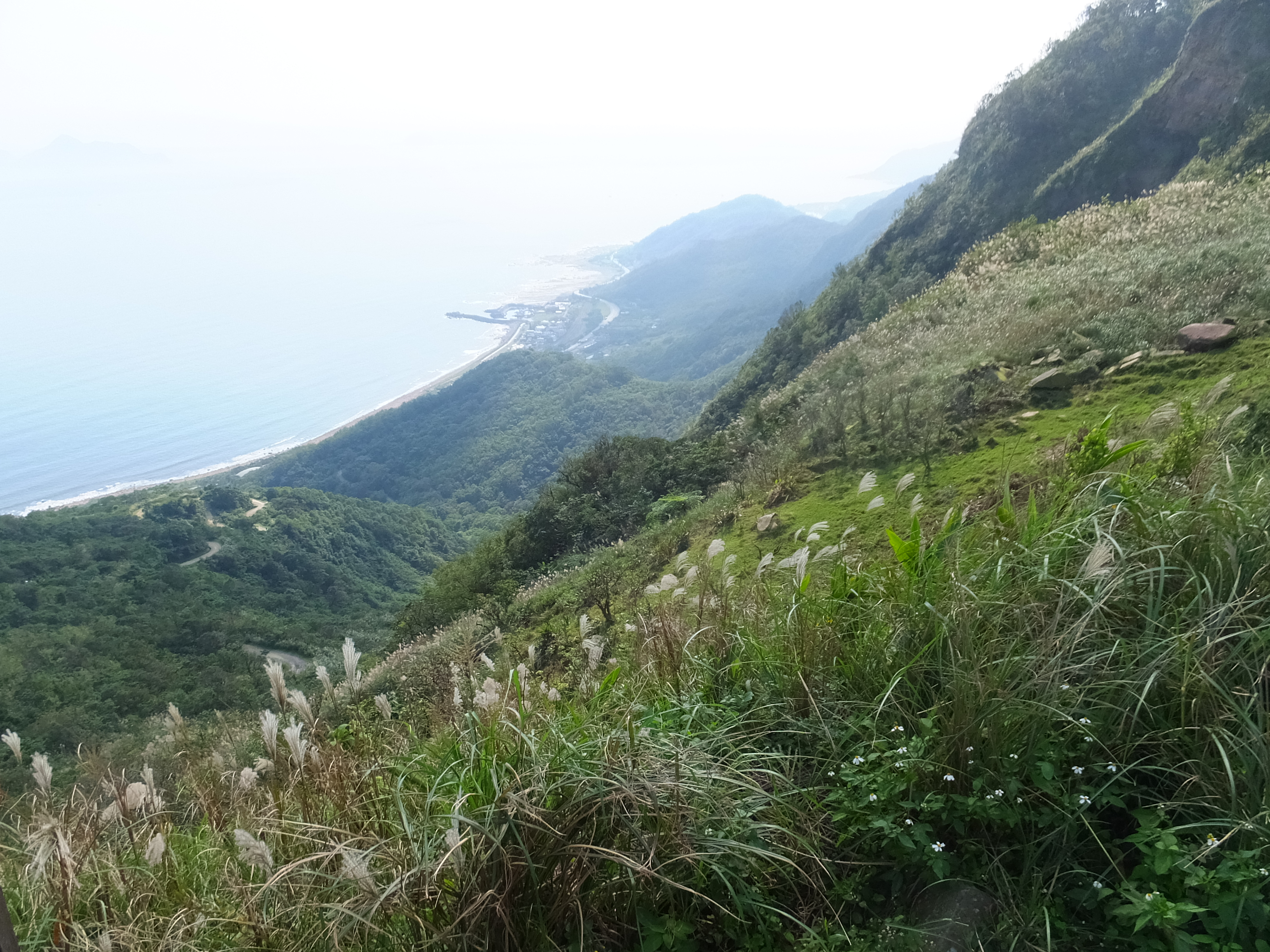
View from Caoling Historic Trail

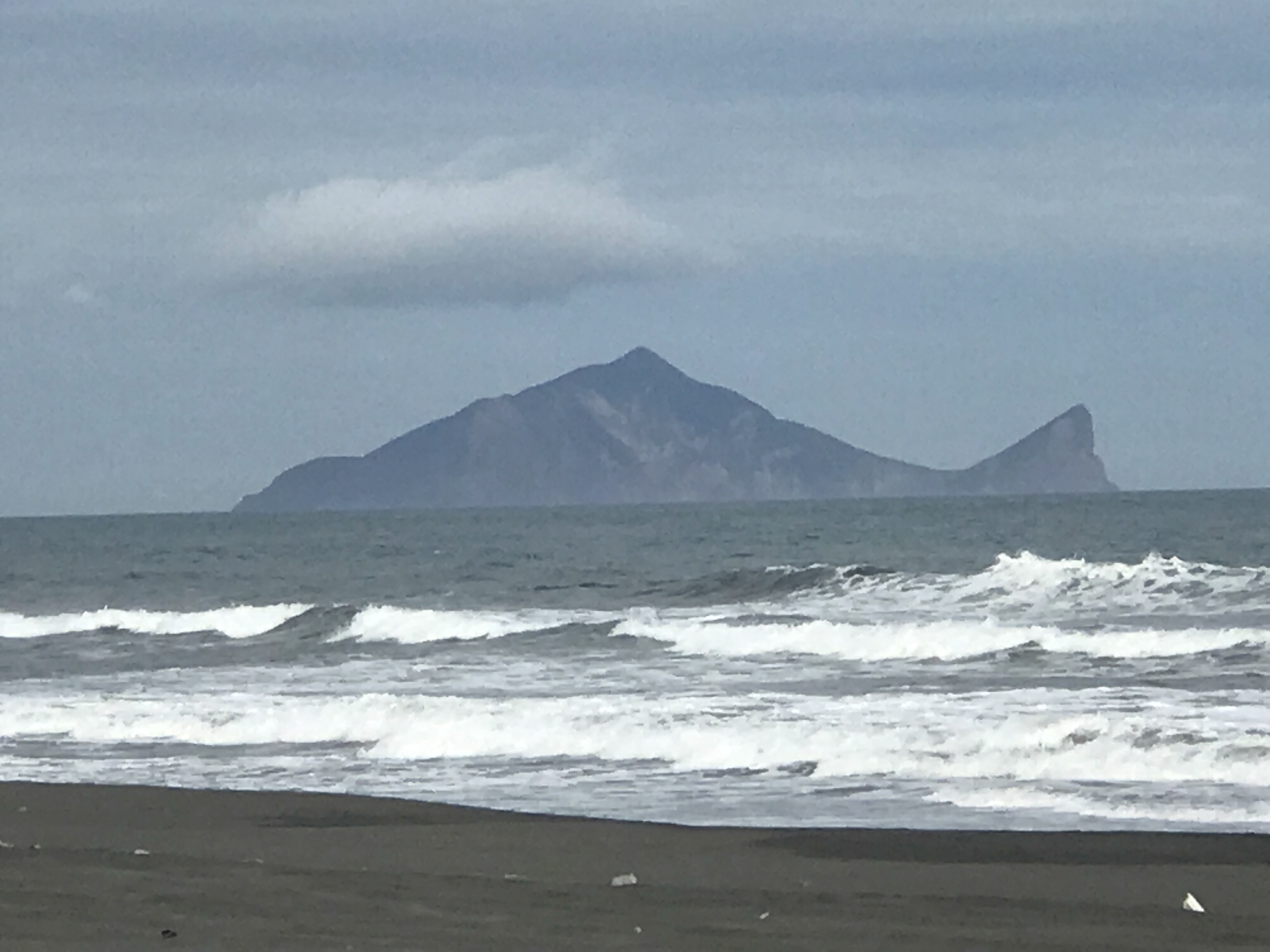
View of Guishan Island (Taiwanese: Ku-suann-tó)

- Beiguan Crabs Museum
- Beiguan Tidal Waves
- Caoling Historic Trail
- Guishan Island
- Hedung Hall Lions Museum
- Honeymoon Bay
- Lanyang Museum
- Lee Rong-chun Literary Museum
- Old Dali Bridge
- Old Tsau Ling Tunnel
- Sea Eroded Rock Formation
- Shihpai Boundary Park
- Taoyuan Valley
- Toucheng Leisure Farm
- Toucheng Old Street

Taiwanese indie rock band Accusefive (告五人) filmed a music video for their hit single 愛人錯過 at the Wushi Harbour North Jetty. The music video was released on 7 August 2019.

== Transportation ==
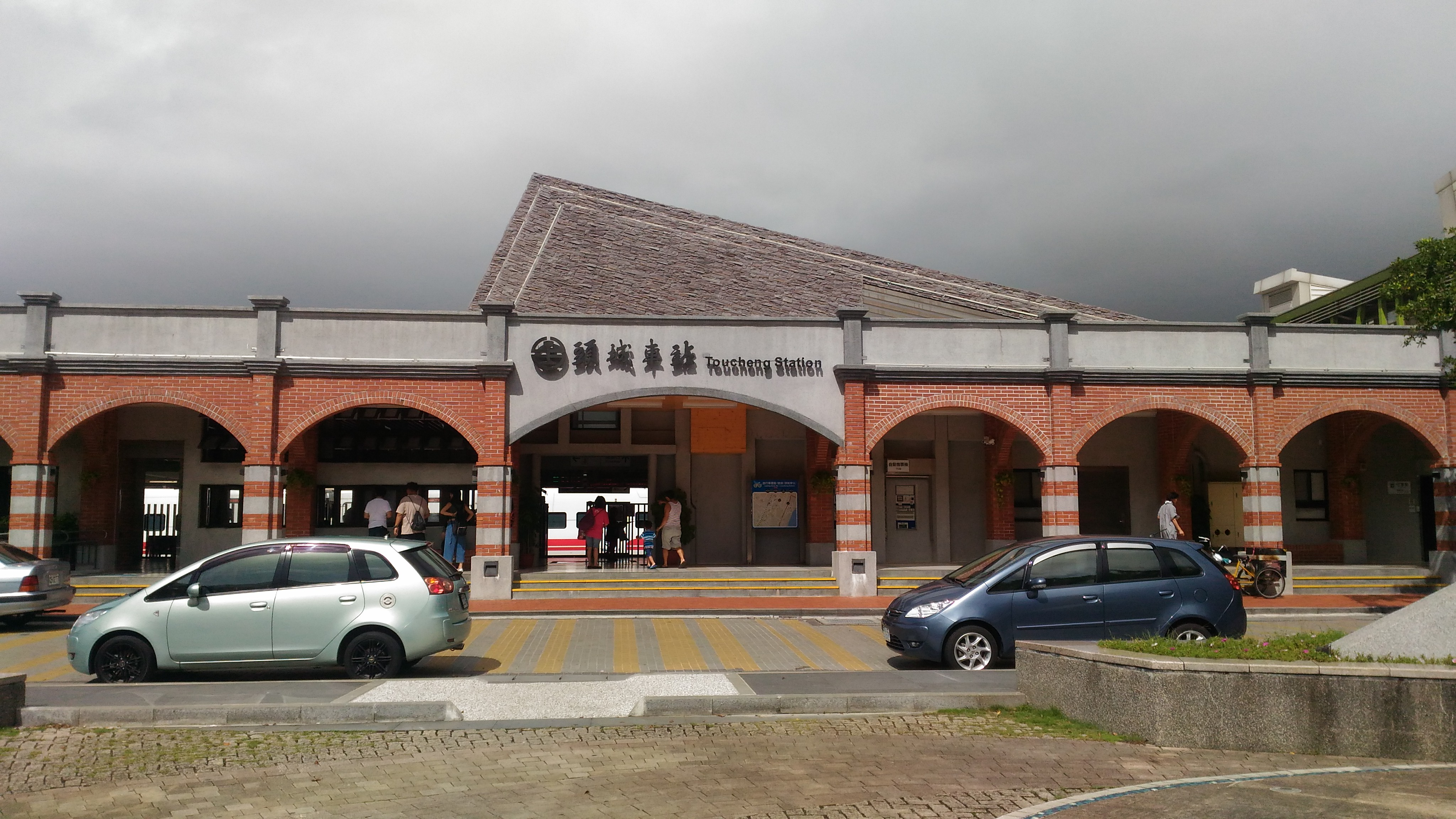
Toucheng Station

Toucheng is served by the Yilan Line of Taiwan Railway on Dali Station, Daxi Station, Dingpu Station, Guishan Station, Sicheng Station, Toucheng Station and Wai-ao Station. Toucheng has more rail stations (three) than any other townships in Taiwan. There are seven stations along the route.

The township has recently seen a marked increase in tourism due to the opening of the Freeway 5 linking it with western Taipei. The freeway consists of a series of tunnels dug through the Snow Mountains, the longest of which measures 12.7 km (7.9 mi). The distance between western Taipei and Toucheng is now 30 km (19 mi) and takes roughly thirty minutes of driving, compared to several hours in the past.

Wushi Harbor is located in the township.

== Notable natives ==
- Lu Kuo-hua, Magistrate of Yilan County (2005–2009)

== See also ==
- List of Taiwanese superlatives
