= China in the Second Sino-Japanese War =

- 1937–1945
Nanjing decade	Chinese Civil War
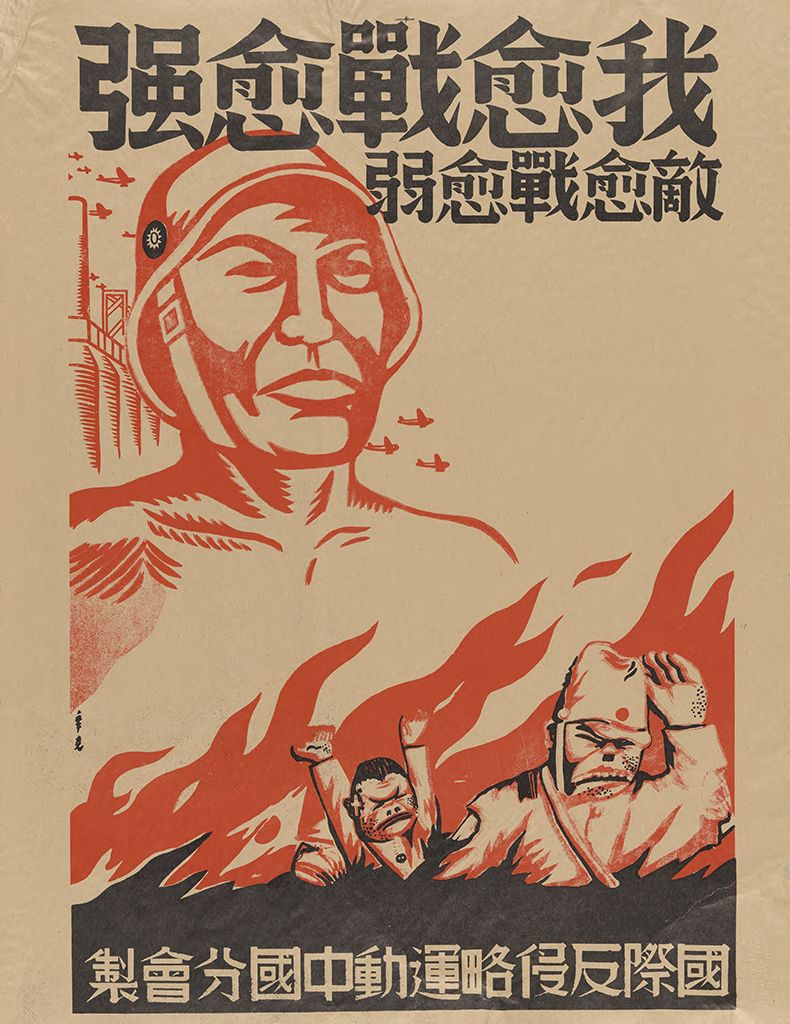
- Chinese propaganda poster from the Second Sino-Japanese War
- Location: Republic of China
- Director-General of the Kuomintang: Chiang Kai-shek
- Presidents: Lin Sen (1931–1943); Chiang Kai-shek (1943–1948)
- Prime Ministers: Chiang Kai-shek (1935–1938; 1939–1945); H. H. Kung (1938–1939); T. V. Soong (1945–1947)

During the Second Sino-Japanese War (1937–1945), China suffered greatly from the Japanese invasion through economic turmoil, and significant population loss and shifts. Following the capture of major coastal cities, the Nationalist government, along with millions of refugees, fled inland. The Nationalist government continued the war effort through efforts such as the Chinese Industrial Cooperatives (CIC), which decentralized manufacturing to support the civilian population and its National Revolutionary Army (NRA).

China was given international assistance and volunteer forces to bolster its war effort. Prior to 1938, Germany provided military training and equipment to the NRA, but withdrew all support after signing the Tripartite Pact with Japan. Afterwards, the Soviet Union became China's primary supporter, supplying aircraft and munitions whilst sending its own volunteer pilots until it too withdrew after the signing of the Soviet–Japanese Neutrality Pact. Following the implementation of an oil embargo against Japan and the outbreak of the Pacific War, the major Allied powers of the United States and United Kingdom delivered significant logistical, financial, and military aid. This included joint intelligence operations, commando training, and the deployment of volunteer aviation units such as the Flying Tigers. Additionally, overseas Chinese communities supported the war effort through contributions in financial and manpower.

The war led to social changes throughout Chinese society. Displaced civilians were forced to abandon traditional household structures, leading unprecedented numbers of women to enter the workforce. Women served in agricultural, medical, and educational sectors, with some participating directly in combat, espionage, and political leadership. Religious minorities, notably Chinese Muslims also supported the war effort. Muslim generals of the Ma clique led cavalry divisions against Japanese forces in the northwest, while Muslim scholars conducted diplomatic tours across the Middle East to secure Islamic support for the Chinese government.

During their invasion, the Imperial Japanese Army and Imperial Japanese Navy committed widespread war crimes, resulting in the deaths of millions of Chinese civilians and prisoners of war. Japanese forces engaged in mass killings through the Three Alls Policy and committed massacres, such as the Nanjing Massacre. Women faced systemic sexual violence and hundreds of thousands of them were forcibly conscripted as comfort women. Additionally, covert military divisions, such as Unit 731, conducted lethal human experimentation and used biological and chemical weapons against both Chinese military and civilian targets alike.

== Economy ==
=== Nationalist-controlled China ===
==== Industrial cooperatives ====
Wartime inflation in Chinese cities, 1938–1945

After Japan's 1931 invasion of Manchuria, the Republic of China began state-led industrialization policies as a response to the risk of full-scale war with Japan. In 1932, it formed a clandestine industrial mobilization government agency, the National Defense Planning Commission (renamed in 1935 to the National Resources Commission). Chinese policymakers drew inspiration from economic models used by the Soviet Union, Japan, and Germany. The ROC established another income tax system in 1936 and it remained in place (with some revisions) until the ROC's defeat in the Chinese Civil War.

The Second Sino-Japanese War had quickly harmed China's economy, with one of the earliest attacks being the Battle of Shanghai in 1937. With Shanghai, being a major industrial and foreign relations port for the Chinese and now under Japanese control, the Chinese economy industry took a big hit. The Japanese Air Force carried out systematic and often indiscriminate bombings of Chinese cities. Nationalist forces applied a "scorched earth" policy in response to the invasion; destroying the productive capacity of areas they had to abandon in the face Japanese military advances.

The war brought about a massive increase in government control of industries. In 1936, government-owned industries were only 15% of GDP. In 1938, the ROC established a commission for industries and mines to control and supervise firms, as well as instilling price controls. By 1942, 70% of the capital of Chinese industry were owned by the government. In an effort to rectify this, Chinese Industrial Cooperatives (CIC) were created in 1937, under the "Gung Ho" Movement, before becoming formalized in 1938. The creation of Chinese Industrial Cooperatives allowed the Chinese people to establish smaller industry centers in small towns across China, allowing for economic and industrial production away from battle or possible Japanese invasion. In addition to supporting the economy, more immediate efforts were placed on supporting the Chinese military in producing whatever materials were needed for the war. Chinese refugees and those displaced by the war were hired by CICs to help production.

The CICs relied on foreign aid and contributions, which drew mixed reactions. Overall, the CIC program failed as they had a goal of creating 30,000 cooperatives, but only succeeded in making approximately 2,000 cooperatives instead. The name "Gung Ho" comes from the Americanization of the Chinese name for Chinese Industrial Cooperatives. The full name, "工業合作社" (gōng yè hé zuò shè) was often shortened to the term "工合" (gōng hé), which was mistaken by U.S. Marine Evans Fordyce Carlson to mean "work together". Carlson then went on to use this believed motto as his slogan throughout the war, generating that phrase "Gung Ho" that has come to be in the English language.

==== Hyperinflation ====
Inflation in wartime China
Year	Nationalist		Communist	Japanese
Year	Chongqing	Chengdu	Fuping	Tianjin
1938	126	128	100	143
1939	220	225	272	232
1940	569	665	1,092	506
1941	1,576	1,769	899	1,099
1942	4,408	4,559	1,469	3,453
1943	13,298	14,720	9,774	14,362
1944	43,050	56,965	34,483	284,302
1945	156,195	170,379	54,601	9,740,248

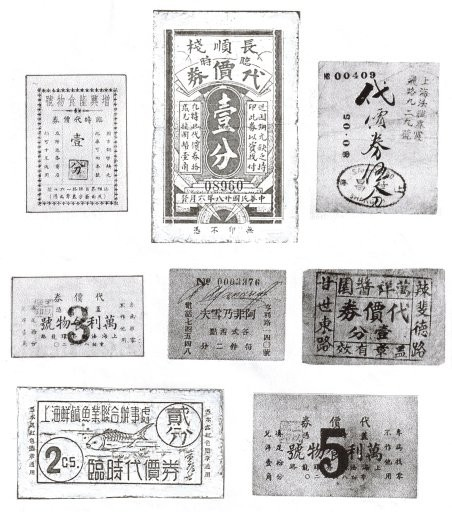
Emergency banknotes issued by various Chinese shops in Shanghai during 1937–1941

From the summer of 1937 through the end of 1949, the Chinese economy suffered inflation and hyperinflation. Starting in July 1937, the Japanese military advanced through northern and eastern China, forcing the Nationalist government to retreat inland and abandon significant manufacturing and agricultural regions, as well as key transport hubs for imports and exports. This retreat, combined with Japanese blockades of Chinese transport routes, led to immediate price surges in Free China. Each successive Japanese victory exacerbated the situation. For instance, the fall of Wuhan and Guangzhou in late 1938 caused import prices to rise by 72%. The Japanese invasion of Guangxi in late 1939 nearly doubled import prices in Chongqing. In contrast, locally produced goods, including food and agricultural raw materials, maintained stable prices until 1938, supported by a robust harvest in Sichuan that year. However, from 1939 onwards, the prices of both imported and local goods began to rise in tandem as around five million refugees moved westward into Free China. Tax revenues decreased drastically while military expenses remained high.

Since the start of the war, the Chinese government began funding its efforts through the issuance of war bonds, which initially enjoyed strong public support. By late 1938, government spending expanded not only for the war effort but also for reconstruction and the development of inland industries and transport infrastructure. This expansion aimed to reinforce infrastructure and sustain the war effort within the remaining Chinese-controlled territories. Consequently, government spending increased by 33%, despite the administration now managing only about half of the country. However, public confidence in war bonds waned, leading to a decline in bond sales since 1938. Additionally, the limited new taxes, which were not introduced until late 1939, failed to offset the government's excessive spending. As a result, the budget deficit continued to grow unchecked. With limited tax revenue from occupied regions and no bond market, China relied on banking institutions to fund deficits, leading to monetary expansion.

Inflation, previously moderate, surged after the Pacific War began. The economic situation further worsened as China became increasingly isolated once Japan occupied British Burma and French Indochina. After the Japanese attack on Pearl Harbor in 1941, Japan quickly seized the whole of Shanghai and, in 1942, cut off the Burma Road, a crucial supply route for China. This led to a 50% decrease in imports in 1942 compared to the previous year. Despite efforts to compensate with The Hump air transport route over the Himalayas, by 1944, China was only receiving 6% of the total imports it had in 1937. Additionally, rice production in southern China faced unfavourable outcomes, although wheat and barley production in Henan and Hebei saw slight increases. Due to administrative failures, the Nationalist government struggled to enforce price control measures, despite issuing decrees to this effect. None of the government's strategies addressed the need to curb its own budget deficit, which continued to generate inflation. The ROC government's tried unsuccessfully to curb inflation with the introduction of new currencies and failed attempts in both 1942 and 1943 to institute a general price freeze. The efforts at price controls failed because China's agricultural economy was very concentrated, industry was declining, and exchange rates collapsing.

In 1942–1943, the American Dollar Bond scandal arose. The Nationalist government of China decided to use US$200 million to absorb excess fabi in an effort to curb inflation. In theory, Chinese purchasers would use fabi to buy bonds at the official exchange rate and be paid in dollars when the bonds were redeemed following victory over Japan. The American Dollar Bonds were issued on March 24, 1942. The public response was poor, with few bond sales. In October 1943, H.H. Kung sent a secret memorandum to Chiang Kai-shek asking that the bond sales end. Subscriptions were closed on October 15, 1943, and a central bank official falsely announced that all bonds had been sold. Secretly, insiders then purchased the remaining bonds using currency acquired on the black market. The result was a windfall for Nationalist government insiders including Kung, the Soong family, Wei Daoming, Long Yun, and others. United States Treasury Secretary Henry Morgenthau Jr. reported to United States President Franklin D. Roosevelt that the US$200 million had been spent with little impact in curbing inflation. Within the Nationalist government of China, Kung was criticized for corruption, and the incident was significant in Chiang losing faith in Kung and removing him from politics.

Although American shipment of gold to China played a critical role in reducing inflation, China's insistence on the official exchange rate of CNC created serious tension with its major ally, the United States. The US Department of the Treasury was also unhappy with the Chinese government's handling of the sale of gold that the United States had supplied to China. American military operations in China also added to the financial difficulty of China. Besides providing food and lodging for US forces, China was responsible for constructing and maintaining military airfields, including costly B-29 bomber bases, which far exceeded initial budgets, costing C$79.9 billion CNC. In 1943, the US offered to cover some expenses in US dollars at an official 20:1 exchange rate, but as the Chinese currency devalued sharply, the agreement became unsustainable. By 1945, the currency's value dropped to 1/2,500 of its pre-war level, with even more severe inflation at major bases like Kunming. This led to the eventual abandonment of the 20:1 rate for payments to US forces. Payments from the US ceased after a final US$45 million settlement for late 1944, forcing China to cover expenses, which accounted for 15%–22% of its fiscal spending. From 1942 to 1945, China disbursed C$246 billion for US military aid, about 7% of its total military expenditures.

In 1944, the advance of Japan's Ichigo campaign cut the Nationalist-controlled areas of China in half. One-fourth of China's manufacturing base was destroyed in the campaign. The loss of more manufacturing, particularly in conjunction with Japanese occupation of major grain production areas, further weakened the Nationalist economy. Throughout the war, but especially after the Ichigo campaign, the Nationalist government could not pay its bills.

==== Post-war recovery and collapse ====
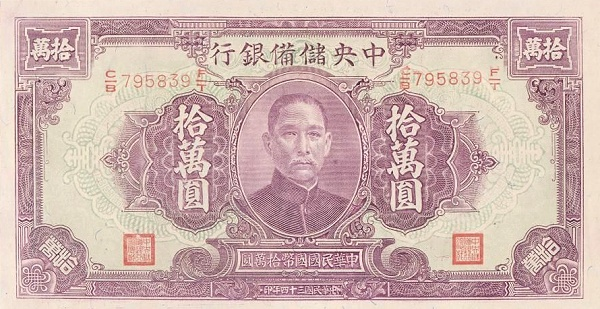
100,000-yuan CRB banknote in 1945

When Japan surrendered in August 1945, the KMT government was able to recover most of the economic centers lost in Second Sino-Japanese War without subjecting them to further destruction. However this ultimately made little difference given the extent of the damage caused by the war and subsequent Japanese occupation. Initially Manchuria, which Japan had transformed into the greatest industrial center in the Far East, had escaped any large scale destruction until the Soviet invasion in the final week of the war. The Red Army rapidly overran Japanese forces, commencing a 3-month occupation defined by systemic campaign of looting and destruction. Soviet Premier Josef Stalin ordered all equipment, moveable parts, tools and even material wealth plundered from private homes, shipped back to the USSR, what could not be pillaged was to be destroyed. When the Soviets withdrew in October, the result was near total. What had been China's industrial epicenter was reduced to rubble, virtually all factories had been destroyed, not a single mine was operational. Manchuria had been stripped of virtually all heavy machinery and was left without even electricity as the Soviets had dismantled or destroyed all power plants, even removing the turbines from dams. Industry was severely hampered after the war by devastating conflict as well as the inflow of cheap American goods. By 1946, Chinese industries operated at 20% capacity and produced just 25% of pre-war output.

The Nationalist government seized Japanese-held businesses at the time of the Japanese surrender. The Nationalist government made little effort to return these businesses to their original Chinese owners. A mechanism existed through which Chinese and foreign owners could petition for the return of their former property. In practice, the Nationalist government and its officials retained a great deal of the seized property and embezzling property, particularly from warehouses, was common. Nationalist officials sometimes extorted money from individuals in liberated territories under threat of labeling them as Japanese collaborators.

=== Communist-controlled China ===
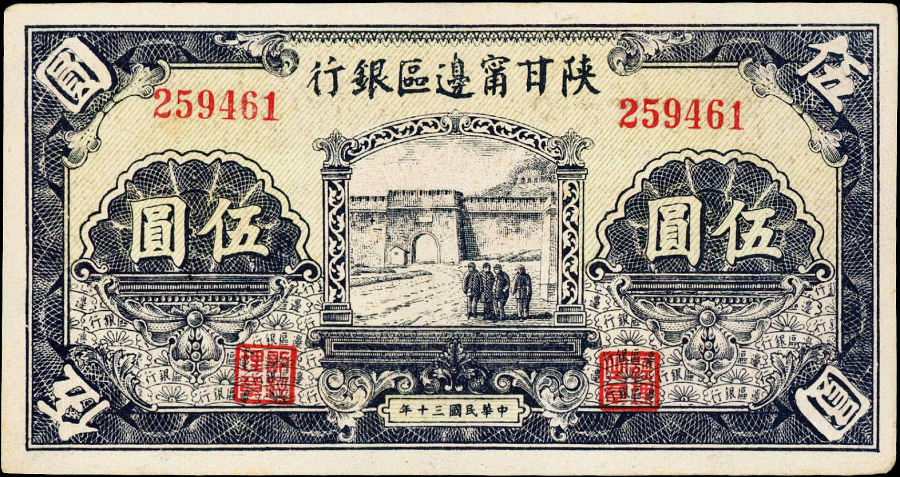
A 5-yuan Communist banknote in 1941

The Communist-controlled areas suffered less from the inflation as they each issued their own currencies and had a self-sufficient economy. Prior to 1942, the Communist-controlled areas in Shandong primarily relied on CNC, which was exchangeable for British Pound Sterling and US dollars, with Communist-issued currencies pegged to CNC. However, following the outbreak of the Pacific War in 1941, the Japanese authorities banned CNC in territories under their control. They dumped hundreds of millions of CNC to acquire essential war supplies, posing a risk of depleting valuable resources from Communist-controlled areas. In response, the Communists decided to prohibit CNC usage. In 1943, the Communist government in Shandong established the Bureau of Industry and Commerce to stabilise their own currency. By purchasing strategic materials and providing financial support to agricultural and industrial production, the Bureau effectively curbed price hikes. Faced with significant inflation, the Communists allegedly planted and sold opium to alleviate their financial difficulty, which supported their currency.

=== Japanese-occupied China ===
Wholesale price index in Shanghai surged after Japanese occupation in 1941

Despite its military success, Japan did not outline any specific plan for China until late 1938, when the Japanese premier declared the intent to establish a New Order in East Asia. A key aspect of this New Order was currency control. However, Japan failed to allocate sufficient funding to support the issuance of stable, credible currencies that could gain broad acceptance. Additionally, the International Settlement of Shanghai, which was the banking centre of China, maintained its neutral status until 1941. This neutrality allowed a free currency market to continue operating independently of directives from Tokyo or Chongqing.

Japanese puppet states in occupied China, 1937-1941

Japan viewed north China as an extension of its homeland, planning to integrate its currency into the yen bloc. The Central Bank of Manchuria, established in 1932, issued yen-pegged yuan banknotes by 1935. In east Hebei, under a puppet regime created by the He-Umezu Agreement of 1935, the Japanese circulated Bank of Chosen notes. These notes, used heavily from July 1937, depreciated due to overuse. To stabilise the situation, Japan's puppet the Provisional Government of the Republic of China established the United Reserve Bank in March 1938, issuing new notes that replaced the Bank of Chosen notes.

The new notes depreciated due to overprinting, leading to inflation. Japanese businessmen also avoided the currency, as it was difficult to convert even to yen. By December 1938, the British Municipal Council of Tianjin, under Japanese pressure, banned the use of CNC. From 1938 to 1941, the note issuance grew by 450%, exacerbating inflation. The Japanese effectively attracted deposits to these puppet banks by offering higher interest rates. This allowed the Japanese to collect CNC for international trades. Additionally, from 1939 onwards, the Japanese Noborito Research Institute engaged in large-scale counterfeiting, producing approximately 4 billion yuan to bolster Japan's war efforts. In early May 1940, Chongqing gave up on efforts to maintain the value of CNC, following significant Japanese purchases of foreign exchange with CNC. By late 1940, the value of FRB notes had surpassed that of CNC notes. In 1941, FRB notes became the primary currency in occupied northern China.

In central and southern China, no immediate effort was made to establish a new currency or banking system, as Japan aimed to treat central and southern China more like foreign territories, similar to Hong Kong. The Japanese military used Military Yen. This currency lacked security and was not backed by reserves, but it was difficult to refuse when presented by Japanese forces. By mid-1940, over 100 million yen was reported to circulate, with estimates reaching up to 600 million. The first significant attempt to introduce a puppet bank was the Huaxing Commercial Bank in May 1939, but it lacked reserves and the currency saw limited use. It was only in 1941, under the Wang Jingwei regime, that serious efforts were made to introduce a new currency in central China.

The Japanese military, reluctant to abandon the use of military yen, was slow to respond to Wang Jingwei's efforts. The depreciation of the CNC slowed in late 1940, giving the Wang regime enough time to secure funding for the new bank, which was eventually founded as the Central Reserve Bank (CRB) in January 1941. In response, Chongqing warned Shanghai businesspeople that accepting the currency would be considered treason. Assassination attempts were made by both the Wang regime and the Nationalist government until CNC was fully banned and the Japanese government agreed to replace military yen with CRB notes, following the Pearl Harbor attack. Despite this, the Wang regime struggled to maintain the value of its currency, and was forced to ban exchanges with FRB notes in northern China, allowing currency transfers only through eleven official banks.

=== Shanghai International Settlement ===
Compared with Tianjin under Japanese rule, Shanghai maintained price stability between 1937 and 1941

Between 1937 and 1941, Shanghai remained prosperous, due to foreign protection. In Shanghai, international connections helped it recover quickly as a trade hub. By 1938, after initial setbacks due to the Sino-Japanese War, imports had rebounded from 3.76 billion yuan in 1938 to 34.1 billion yuan by 1941. Exports also rose from 2.22 billion yuan in 1938 to 19.29 billion yuan in 1941. However, the city constantly saw a shortage of rice. Traditionally sustained by the surplus from nearby Zhejiang and Jiangsu provinces, Shanghai had to import more rice from Saigon due to conflicts in neighbouring areas. While rice prices stabilised when transport links with inland China were restored in 1938, they surged again in 1939 as the Japanese military began forcibly requisitioning rice from surrounding provinces. By 1940, Shanghai was entirely reliant on rice imports from Southeast Asia.

The economic boom of wartime Shanghai was marked by speculative behaviour and a lack of regulation. People hoarded rice and other materials, which led to daily inflation. By 1940, the price of fine rice had grown to four times the pre-war price. In 1939, stock market activity became uncontrollable, and trading of war-related commodities like cotton drove prices up. Cotton that sold for 1,000 yuan per bale in September 1939 doubled to 2,000 yuan by May 1940. However, the French surrender to Germany in June 1940 led to the collapse of inflated prices. This resulted in the overnight bankruptcy of over 50 import-export firms and steep declines in stock values.

Although factories attempted to provide substitutes for workers, these efforts were insufficient to maintain a decent standard of living due to rampant price hikes of rice and rents. This led to a surge in protests, demonstrations, and violent crimes. Labour movements increased significantly, rising from 21 instances in 1938 to 282 in 1941. Following the Japanese capture of Shanghai in December 1941, inflation in the city further worsened, unemployment rose, and production declined, as a result of inadequate supplies under the Japanese rationing system.

== Society ==
=== Women ===
Most women in China were profoundly impacted by the Second Sino-Japanese War (also referred to in China as the War of Resistance), in which the Empire of Japan fought the Republic of China starting in 1937, primarily due to the Marco Polo Bridge Incident on July 7, 1937. Women's experiences during the war depended on a variety of factors, including class, place of origin, and social connections. The household, gender roles, and women's occupations changed during the war.

With fewer men at home during the war, women took on different kinds of work to provide for their families, such as farming. The war prompted the feminization of several industries, such as agriculture and nursing. Women contributed to the Second Sino-Japanese war in various capacities, such as in medical work, education, women's organizations, and on the battlefield. Women's work during the war was vitally important and helped China make it through the war. By providing for their families by working out of the house, women disrupted gender norms and transformed gender roles. After the war, women in China continued working. They no longer had to rely solely on male family members to stay afloat.

=== Muslims ===
In the Second Sino-Japanese War, Chinese Muslims were courted by both Chinese and Japanese generals. However, they tended to fight against the Japanese, regardless of support from higher echelons of the other Chinese factions. The Japanese attempted to justify their invasion to the Muslim Chinese by promises of liberation and self-determination. Chinese Muslims rejected that, and jihad (Islamic struggle) was declared to be obligatory and sacred for all Chinese Muslims against Japan.

Japan's attempt to get the Muslim Hui people on its side failed because many generals such as Bai Chongxi, Ma Hongbin, Ma Hongkui, and Ma Bufang were Hui and fought against the Imperial Japanese Army. The anti-Japanese Kuomintang maintained the allegiance of the Ma Clique. During the war against Japan, the Imams supported Muslim resistance in battle, calling for Muslims to participate in the jihad against Japan and become shahids (martyrs). To gain backing for China in Muslim countries, Egypt, Syria, and Turkey were visited by a Hui Muslim, Ma Fuliang, and a Uyghur Muslim, Isa Yusuf Alptekin, in 1939.

== Foreign aid ==
=== Overseas Chinese ===
Over 3,200 overseas Chinese drivers and motor vehicle mechanics embarked to wartime China to support military and logistics supply lines, especially through Indo-China, which became of absolute tantamount importance when the Japanese cut-off all ocean-access to China's interior with the capture of Nanning after the Battle of South Guangxi.

Overseas Chinese communities in the U.S. raised money and nurtured talent in response to Imperial Japan's aggressions in China, which helped to fund an entire squadron of Boeing P-26 fighter planes purchased for the looming war situation between China and the Empire of Japan; over a dozen Chinese-American aviators, including John "Buffalo" Huang, Arthur Chin, Hazel Ying Lee, Chan Kee-Wong et al., formed the original contingent of foreign volunteer aviators to join the Chinese air forces (some provincial or warlord air forces, but ultimately all integrating into the centralized Chinese Air Force; often called the Nationalist Air Force of China) in the "patriotic call to duty for the motherland" to fight against the Imperial Japanese invasion. Several of the original Chinese-American volunteer pilots were sent to Lagerlechfeld Air Base in Germany for aerial-gunnery training by the Chinese Air Force in 1936.

Throughout the course of the war hundreds of overseas Chinese pilots and aircraft maintenance technicians from the United States, the Philippines, Thailand, Indonesia, Malaysia, Vietnam, Canada, and other countries fought in China and made up a significant portion of the Chinese Air Force. At least 13 were confirmed to have died in the line of duty or from illnesses.

=== Korea ===
The exiled Provisional Government of the Republic of Korea (KPG) based in Chongqing allied with Chiang Kai-shek and the Nationalist Army against the Japanese. The KPG established the Korean Liberation Army (KLA) to fight against the Japanese in China.

=== Germany ===
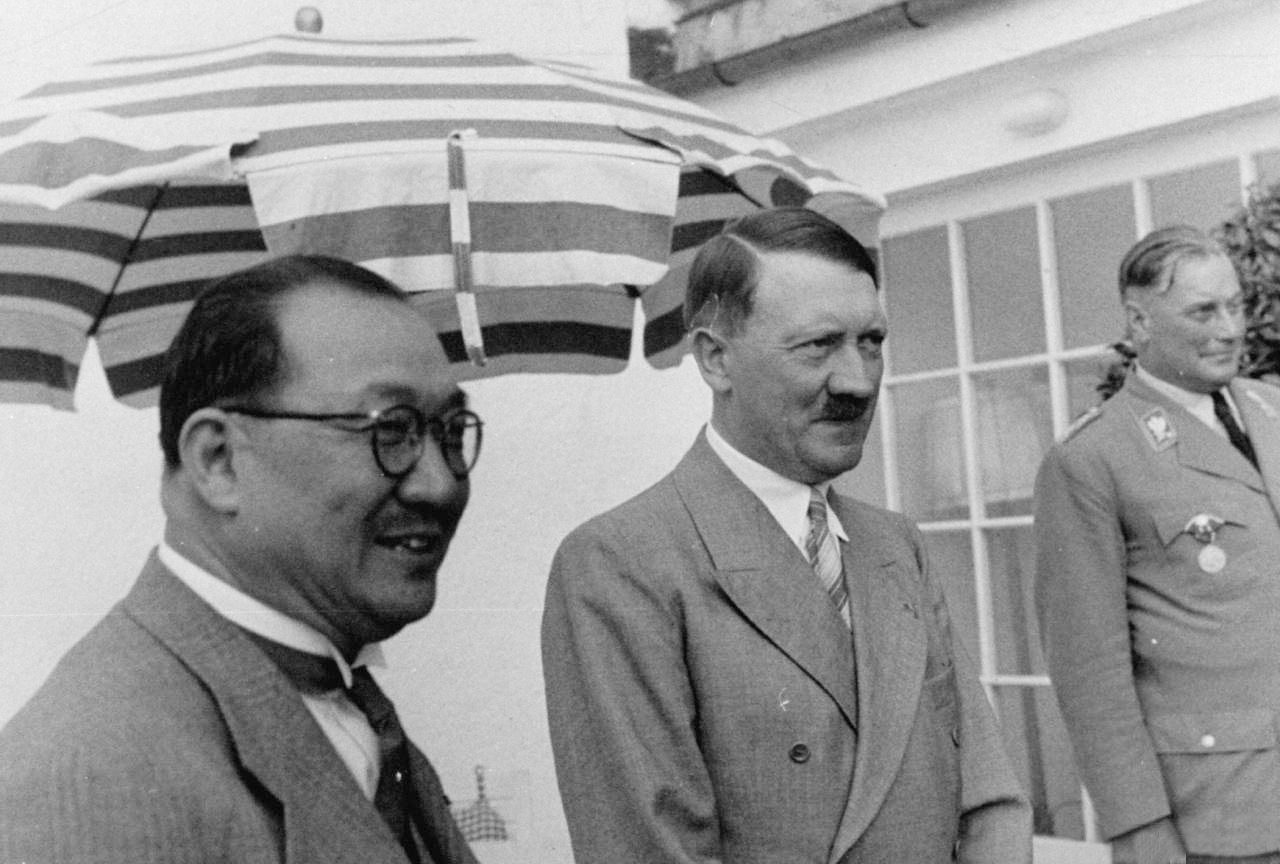
H. H. Kung and Adolf Hitler in Berlin, 1936

Prior to the war, Germany and China were in close economic and military cooperation, with Germany helping China modernize its industry and military in exchange for raw materials. Before the start of full-scale warfare of the Second Sino-Japanese War, Germany had since the time of the Weimar Republic, provided much equipment and training to crack units of the National Revolutionary Army of China, including some aerial-combat training with the Luftwaffe to some pilots of the pre-Nationalist Air Force of China. Germany sent military advisers such as Alexander von Falkenhausen to China to help the KMT government reform its armed forces.

Some divisions began training to German standards and were to form a relatively small but well trained Chinese Central Army. By the mid-1930s about 80,000 soldiers had received German-style training. After the KMT lost Nanjing and retreated to Wuhan, Hitler's government decided to withdraw its support of China in 1938 in favour of an alliance with Japan as its main anti-Communist partner in East Asia.

=== Soviet Union ===
==== Material support ====
Prior to the Western Allies, the Soviets provided the most foreign aid to China: some $250 million in credits for munitions and other supplies. Signing the Sino-Soviet Non-Aggression Pact in 1937 following Germany and Japan's Anti-Comintern Pact. The Soviet Union hoped to keep China fighting, in order to deter a Japanese invasion of Siberia and save itself from a two-front war. In September 1937, they signed the Sino-Soviet Non-Aggression Pact and approved Operation Zet. By late 1937, a highway connecting the Kazakh SSR to Lanzhou to facilitate the transport of these supplies began construction. This highway would be constructed by 100,000 civilian corvée laborers from the Hexi Corridor alongside 20,000 soldiers under Ma Buqing's command.. From October 1937 to June 1941, it would transport over 30,000 tons of war materiel to China. This facilitated the formation of a secret Soviet volunteer air force. In which Ilyushin DB-3 and Tupolev TB-3 bombers were provided alongside Polikarpov I-15 and I-16 fighters.

==== Military support ====
The Soviet Union defeated Japan in the Battle of Lake Khasan in August 1938. As well as the Battles of Khalkhin Gol from May to September 1939, leaving the Japanese reluctant to fight the Soviets again. Aleksandr Cherepanov headed the Soviet contingent of advisors. The Soviet Union also provided financial aid to both the Communists and the Nationalists. In total, 3,665 Soviet advisors and pilots served in China, and 227 of them died fighting there.

In April 1941, Soviet aid to China ended with the Soviet–Japanese Neutrality Pact and the beginning of the Great Patriotic War. This pact enabled the Soviet Union to avoid fighting against Germany and Japan at the same time. In August 1945, the Soviet Union annulled the neutrality pact with Japan and began the Soviet-Japanese War, resulting in the Soviet occupation of Manchuria and Inner Mongolia until 1946.

=== United Kingdom ===
After the Tanggu Truce of 1933, Chiang Kai-Shek and the British government would have more friendly relations but were uneasy due to British foreign concessions there. During the Second Sino-Japanese War the British government would initially have an impartial viewpoint toward the conflict urging both to reach an agreement and prevent war. British public opinion would swing in favor of the Chinese after Hughe Knatchbull-Hugessen's car which had Union Jacks on it was attacked by Japanese aircraft with Hugessen being temporarily paralyzed with outrage against the attack from the public and government. The British public were largely supportive of the Chinese and many relief efforts were untaken to help China.

Britain at this time was beginning the process of rearmament and the sale of military surplus was banned but there was never an embargo on private companies shipping arms. A number of unassembled Gloster Gladiator fighters were imported to China via Hong Kong for the Chinese Air Force. Between July 1937 and November 1938 on average 60,000 tons of munitions were shipped from Britain to China via Hong Kong. Attempts by the United Kingdom and the United States to do a joint intervention were unsuccessful as both countries had rocky relations in the interwar era. After the Japanese blocked the Burma Road in April 1942, and before the Ledo Road was finished in early 1945, the majority of US and British supplies to the Chinese had to be delivered via airlift over the eastern end of the Himalayas known as "The Hump". Flying over the Himalayas was extremely dangerous, but the airlift continued daily to August 1945, at great cost in men and aircraft.

==== Commando operations ====
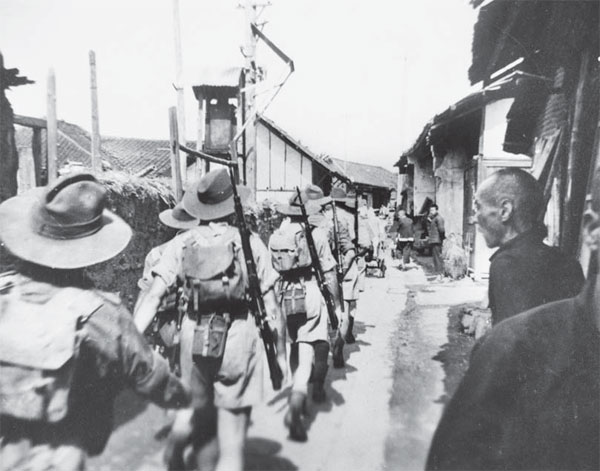
British and Australian troops from 'Mission 204' march to the front in Jiangxi province in June 1942

In February 1941 a Sino-British agreement was forged whereby British troops would assist the Chinese "Surprise Troops" units of guerrillas already operating in China, and China would assist Britain in Burma. When Hong Kong was overrun in December 1941, the British Army Aid Group (B.A.A.G.) was set up and headquartered in Guilin, Guangxi. Its aim was to assist prisoners of war and internees to escape from Japanese camps. This led to the formation of the Hong Kong Volunteer Company which later fought in Burma. B.A.A.G. also sent agents to gather intelligence – military, political and economic in Southern China, as well as giving medical and humanitarian assistance to Chinese civilians and military personnel.

A British-Australian commando operation, Mission 204 (Tulip Force), was initialized in 1941 to provide training to Chinese guerrilla troops. The mission conducted two operations, mostly in the provinces of Yunnan and Jiangxi.

The first operation commenced in February 1942 from Burma on a long journey to the Chinese front. Due to issues with supporting the Chinese and gradual disease and supply issues, the first phase achieved very little and the unit was withdrawn in September.

A second phase was set up with lessons learned from the first. Commencing in February 1943 this time valid assistance was given to the Chinese 'Surprise Troops' in various actions against the Japanese. These involved ambushes, attacks on airfields, blockhouses, and supply depots. The unit operated successfully before withdrawal in November 1944.

Commandos and members of SOE who had formed Force 136, worked with the Free Thai Movement who also operated in China, mostly while on their way into Thailand.

=== United States ===
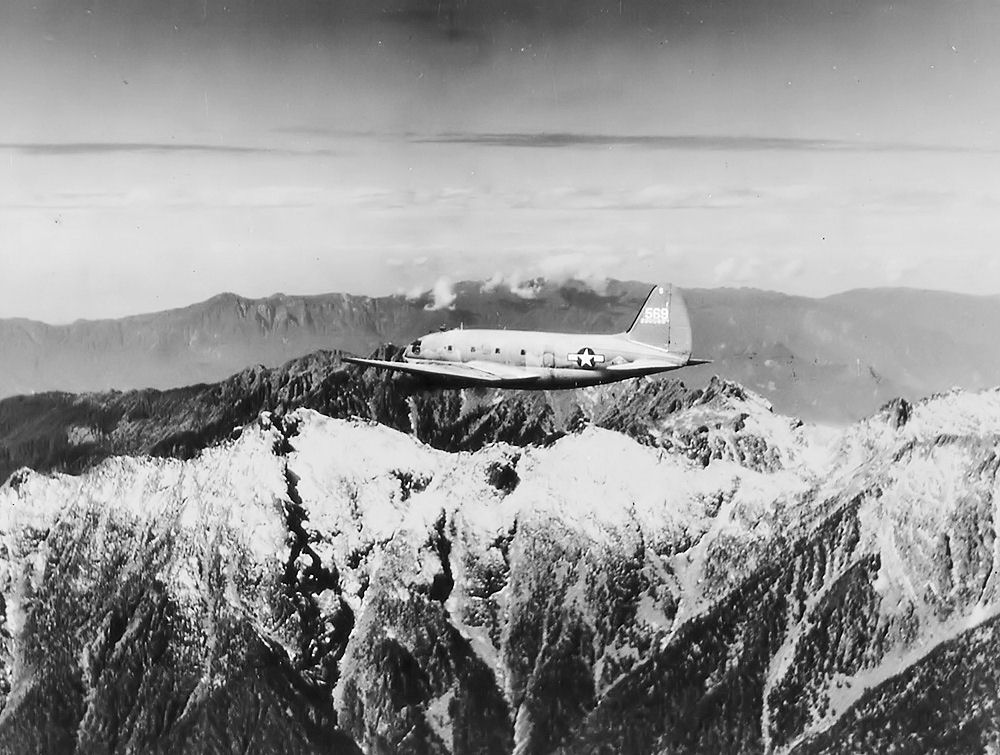
The Hump was the only route of imports for China in 1942–1944

==== Pre-war neutrality ====
The United States generally avoided taking sides between Japan and China until 1940, providing virtually no aid to China in this period. For instance, the 1934 Silver Purchase Act signed by President Roosevelt caused chaos in China's economy which helped the Japanese war effort. The 1933 Wheat and Cotton Loan mainly benefited American producers, while aiding to a smaller extent both Chinese and Japanese alike. This policy was due to US fear of breaking off profitable trade ties with Japan, in addition to US officials and businesses perception of China as a potential source of massive profit for the US by absorbing surplus American products, as William Appleman Williams states.

From December 1937, events such as the Japanese attack on USS Panay and the Nanjing Massacre swung public opinion in the West sharply against Japan and increased their fear of Japanese expansion, which prompted the United States, the United Kingdom, and France to provide loan assistance for war supply contracts to China. Australia also prevented a Japanese government-owned company from taking over an iron mine in Australia, and banned iron ore exports in 1938. However, in July 1939, negotiations between Japanese Foreign Minister Hachirō Arita and the British Ambassador in Tokyo, Robert Craigie, led to an agreement by which the United Kingdom recognized Japanese conquests in China. At the same time, the US government extended a trade agreement with Japan for six months, then fully restored it.

==== Oil embargo ====
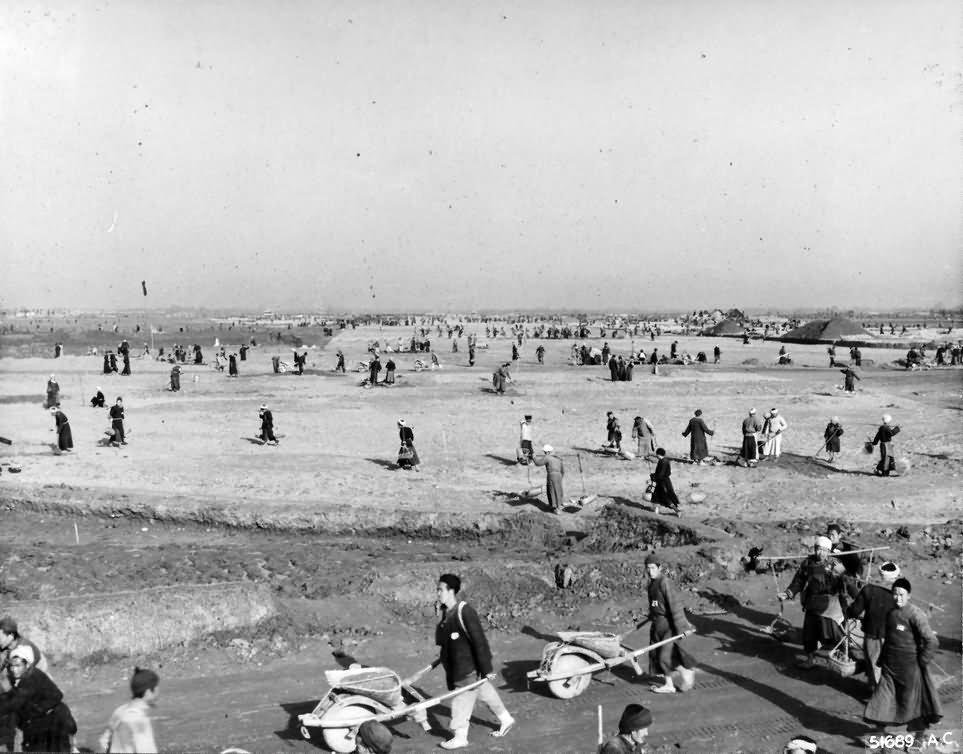
Building B-29 bases in China, February 1944

Japan invaded and occupied the northern part of French Indochina in September 1940 to prevent China from receiving the 10,000 tons of materials delivered monthly by the Allies via the Haiphong–Yunnan Fou Railway line. On 22 June 1941, Germany attacked the Soviet Union. In spite of non-aggression pacts or trade connections, Hitler's assault threw the world into a frenzy of re-aligning political outlooks and strategic prospects.

On 21 July, Japan occupied the southern part of French Indochina (southern Vietnam and Cambodia), contravening a 1940 gentlemen's agreement not to move into southern French Indochina. From bases in Cambodia and southern Vietnam, Japanese planes could attack Malaya, Singapore, and the Dutch East Indies. As the Japanese occupation of northern French Indochina in 1940 had already cut off supplies from the West to China, the move into southern French Indochina was viewed as a direct threat to British and Dutch colonies. Many principal figures in the Japanese government and military (particularly the navy) were against the move, as they foresaw that it would invite retaliation from the West.

On 24 July 1941, Roosevelt requested Japan withdraw all its forces from Indochina. Two days later the US and the UK began an oil embargo; two days after that the Netherlands joined them. This was a decisive moment in the Second Sino-Japanese War. The loss of oil imports made it impossible for Japan to continue operations in China on a long-term basis. It set the stage for Japan to launch a series of military attacks against the Allies, including the attack on Pearl Harbor on 7 December 1941.

When the Imperial Japanese invaded French Indochina, the United States enacted the oil and steel embargo against Japan and froze all Japanese assets in 1941, and with it came the Lend-Lease Act of which China became a beneficiary on 6 May 1941; from there, China's main diplomatic, financial and military support came from the U.S., particularly following the attack on Pearl Harbor.

==== Military volunteers ====
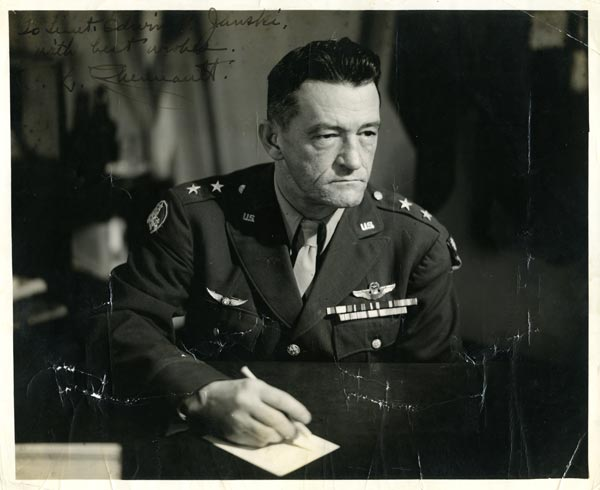
Flying Tigers Commander Claire Lee Chennault

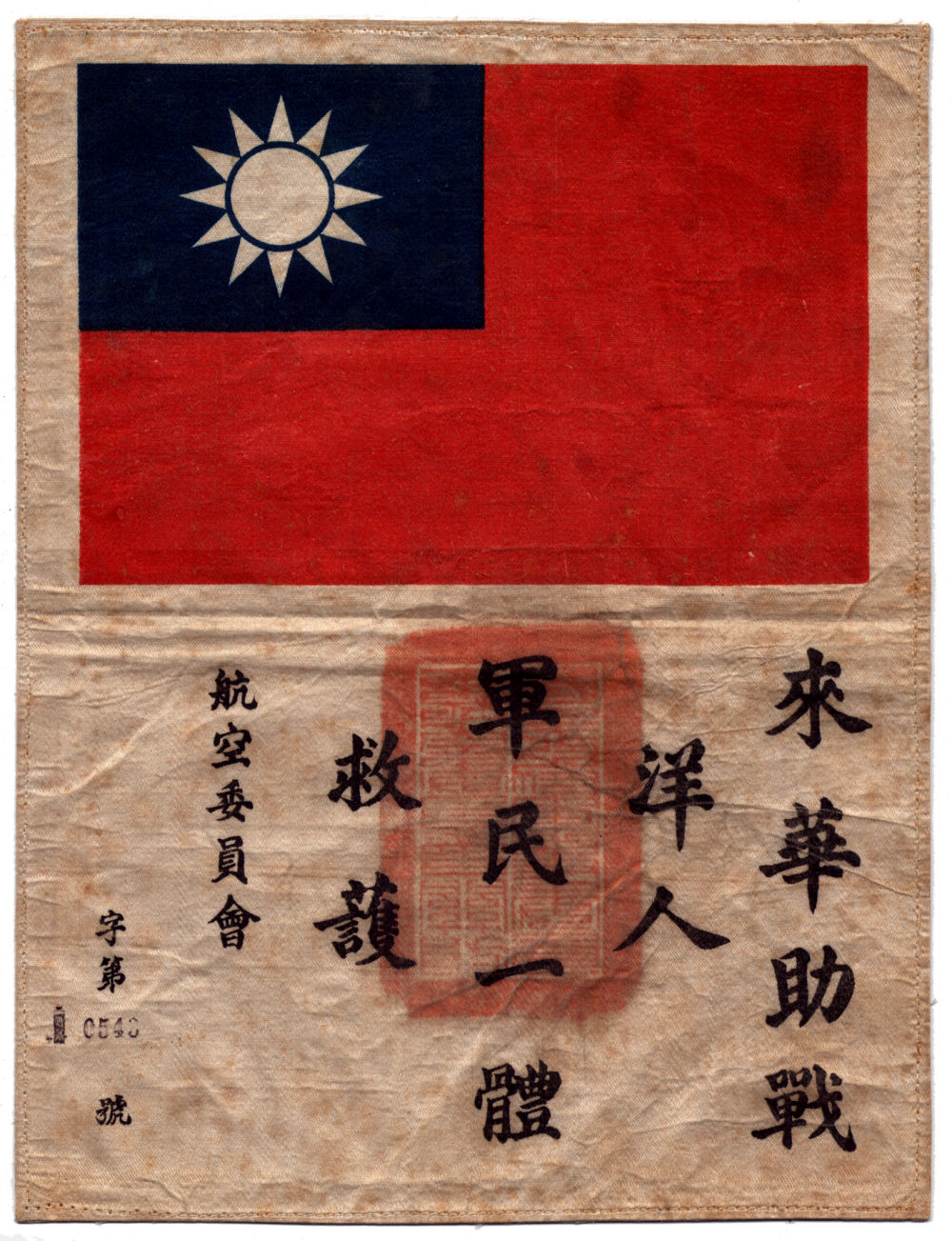
A "blood chit" issued to American Volunteer Group pilots requesting all Chinese to offer rescue and protection

In mid-1941, the United States government financed the creation of the American Volunteer Groups (AVG), of which one the "Flying Tigers" reached China, to replace the withdrawn Soviet volunteers and aircraft. The Flying Tigers did not enter actual combat until after the United States had declared war on Japan. Led by Chennault, their early combat success of 300 kills against a loss of 12 of their newly introduced Curtiss P-40 Warhawk fighters heavily armed with six 0.50-inch caliber machine guns and very fast diving speeds earned them wide recognition at a time when the Chinese Air Force and Allies in the Pacific and SE Asia were suffering heavy losses, and soon afterwards their "boom and zoom" high-speed hit-and-run air combat tactics would be adopted by the United States Army Air Forces.

Disagreements existed both between the United States and the Nationalists, and within the United States military, about the form of aid. Chennault contended that aid should be in the form of building on the success of the Flying Tigers and go to the US Fourteenth Air Force in China. Lieutenant General Joseph Stilwell, who was in charge of training Nationalist divisions equipped by the United States, became increasingly frustrated by the Nationalists' refusal to use them to fight the Japanese in Burma or in southeastern China.

==== Intelligence operations ====
Knowledge of Japanese naval movements in the Pacific was provided to the American Navy by the Sino-American Cooperative Organization (SACO) which was run by the Chinese intelligence head Dai Li. Philippine and Japanese ocean weather was affected by weather originating near northern China. The base of SACO was located in Yangjiashan. The Sino-American Cooperative Organization was an organization created by the SACO Treaty signed by the Republic of China and the United States of America in 1942 that established a mutual intelligence gathering entity in China between the respective nations against Japan.

It operated in China jointly along with the Office of Strategic Services (OSS), America's first intelligence agency and forerunner of the CIA while also serving as joint training program between the two nations. Among all the wartime missions that Americans set up in China, SACO was the only one that adopted a policy of "total immersion" with the Chinese. The "Rice Paddy Navy" or "What-the-Hell Gang" operated in the China-Burma-India theater, advising and training, forecasting weather and scouting landing areas for USN fleet and Gen Claire Chennault's 14th AF, rescuing downed American flyers, and intercepting Japanese radio traffic.

An underlying mission objective during the last year of war was the development and preparation of the China coast for Allied penetration and occupation. Fujian was scouted as a potential staging area and springboard for the future military landing of the Allies in Japan. American and Canadian-born Chinese were recruited to act as covert operatives in Japanese-occupied China. Employing their racial background as a disguise, their mandate was to blend in with local citizens and wage a campaign of sabotage. Activities focused on destruction of Japanese transportation of supplies (signaling bomber destruction of railroads, bridges).

== War crimes ==
Both before and during World War II, the Empire of Japan committed numerous war crimes and crimes against humanity across various Asian–Pacific nations, most notably during the Second Sino-Japanese and Pacific Wars. The Imperial Japanese Army (IJA) and the Imperial Japanese Navy (IJN) were responsible for war crimes which resulted in millions of deaths, ranging from sexual slavery and massacres to unethical human experimentation, torture, starvation, and forced labour. According to Werner Gruhl, approximately eight million Chinese civilian deaths were directly attributable to Japanese aggression. According to Rummel, in China alone, from 1937 to 1945, approximately 3.9 million Chinese were killed, mostly civilians, as a direct result of the Japanese operations and a total of 10.2 million Chinese were killed in the course of the war.

One of the major atrocities which was committed during this period was the Nanjing Massacre of 1937–38, when, according to the findings of the International Military Tribunal for the Far East, the Japanese Army massacred as many as 260,000 civilians and prisoners of war, but some have placed the death toll as high as 350,000. Historian Mitsuyoshi Himeta reports that a "Three Alls Policy" (Sankō Sakusen) was implemented in China from 1942 to 1945, and by itself resulted in the deaths of "more than 2.7 million" Chinese civilians.

Special Japanese military units conducted experiments on civilians and POWs in China. Biological agents and gases developed from these experiments were used against the Chinese Army and civilian population. Based on available data, a total of 103,069 Chinese soldiers and civilians died from biological and chemical weapons. Furthermore, according to the 2002 International Symposium on the Crimes of Bacteriological Warfare, the number of people killed by the Imperial Japanese Army germ warfare and human experiments is around 580,000. While obtaining precise numbers is difficult, recent studies indicate that the number of Chinese killed by Japanese chemical warfare may have been in excess of 500,000 people.

Women were subject to sexual violence throughout the Second Sino-Japanese War. Thousands of girls in China were forced to work in military brothels as sex slaves, also known as comfort women. While estimates vary, scholars agree that the number of women enslaved as comfort women numbered over 200,000.

The Japanese military's use of forced labor, by Asian civilians and POWs, also caused many deaths. According to a joint study by historians including Zhifen Ju, Mitsuyoshi Himeta, Toru Kubo, and Mark Peattie, more than 10 million Chinese civilians were mobilised by the Kōa-in (Japanese Asia Development Board) to perform forced labour. Japanese imperial forces employed widespread use of torture on prisoners of war, usually in an effort to gather military intelligence quickly. Several scholars have claimed that the Japanese government, along with Japanese military personnel, engaged in widespread looting during the period of 1895 to 1945.
