= Chinese hyperinflation =

Inflation in China from the 1930s to 1950s

- Part of the Chinese Civil War and the Second Sino-Japanese War
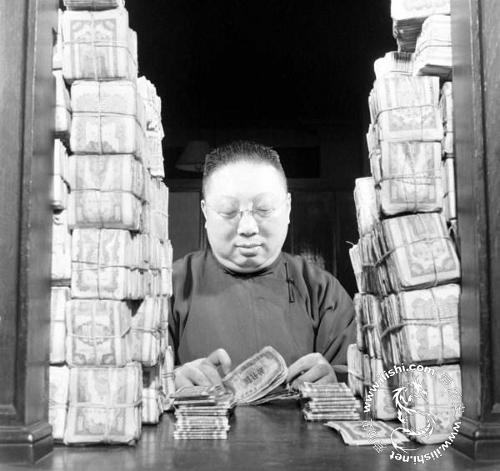
- Preparing to pay wages in 1940s China
- Date: Late 1930s to early 1950s
- Location: Mainland China (Extended to Taiwan in 1945)
- Cause: State monopoly of money supply since the 1935 currency reform; Deficit spending; Poor financial governance and corruption; Nationalist military failures

The Chinese hyperinflation was the phenomenon of extreme inflation that emerged in China during the late 1930s, extended to Taiwan after the Japanese surrender in 1945, and concluded in the early 1950s.

After a significant speculative outflow of China's physical silver to the United States of America due to the Roosevelt administration's Silver Purchase Act of 1934 resulted in insufficient silver reserves relative to notes issued, the Nationalist government abandoned the traditional silver standard and introduced its own paper currency, the Chinese National Currency (CNC), in the 1935 currency reform. However, this currency was issued without sufficient credit or reserve backing. The Nationalist government's reliance on deficit spending led to unchecked monetary expansion, resulting in rapid currency depreciation. This situation was aggravated by the financial burden of the Second Sino-Japanese War and the subsequent phase of the Chinese Civil War. To control the price hike, the government attempted to introduce a new currency, namely the Chinese gold yuan (GY) in 1948, along with price and wage controls. Ultimately, they proved infeasible due to extensive corruption and administrative failures.

The hyperinflation eroded popular support for the Nationalists across China, contributing to the collapse of the Republic of China on the Mainland. In contrast, the Communists' more prudent economic control aided their rise to power. In Taiwan, the Nationalists eventually restored financial stability using the Chinese gold taken to the island during their retreat from the mainland, as well as owing to American financial support.

== Origins ==
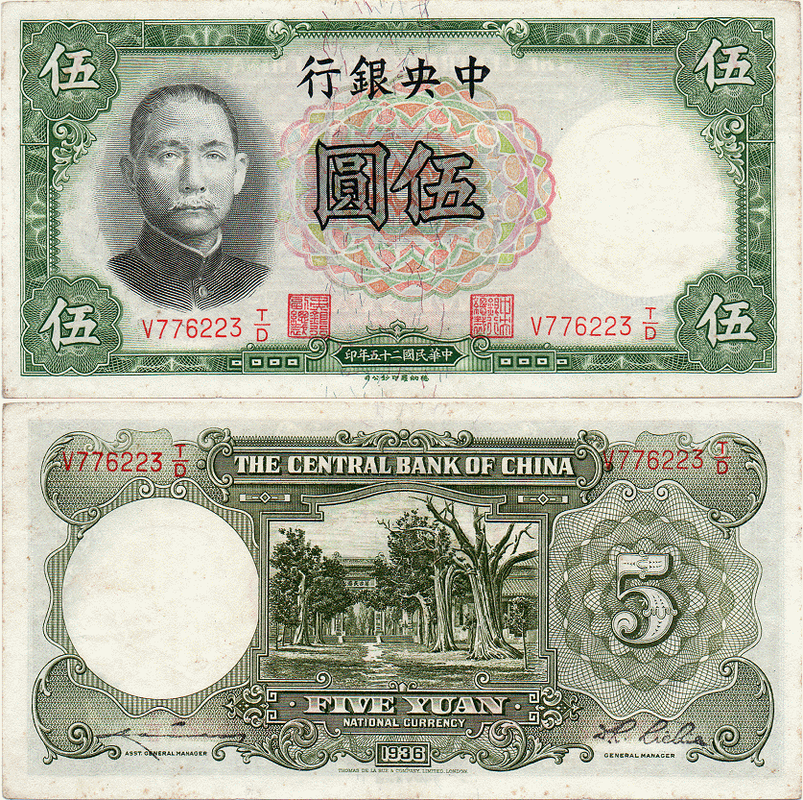
A 5-yuan CNC banknote in 1936

In 1905, the Imperial Chinese government founded the Hubu Bank, granting it the authority to issue banknotes. At the time, Chinese leaders, whether conservative or revolutionary, believed that increasing the issuance of banknotes would allow them to outspend their revenues. Although subsequent republican governments sought to unify the national currency, progress was slow by 1937 due to internal conflicts and concerns about foreign intervention, as the plan potentially required substantial foreign loans. As a result, silver bullion still dominated the market, circulated and exchanged in various forms and weights without fixed ratios.

=== Silver outflow in the 1930s ===
In 1933, China was the only major country to use a silver standard. The use of silver protected China from the initial impact of the Great Depression in 1929, as it primarily traded with gold-standard countries, which saw a reduced silver price, effectively debasing the Chinese currency. The Roosevelt administration enacted Executive Order 6814 and the Silver Purchase Act of 1934. The resulting US silver purchase program, authorised by the Thomas Amendment in 1933 significantly affected China's silver-based currency by raising silver prices and increasing the global price of silver. This caused a massive speculative outflow of China's physical silver reserves to the United States, facilitated in large measure by the semi-colonial foreign owned and managed banks and trading houses that constituted a sizeable part of the financial sector. These foreign banks in China had until 1935 also possessed the right to issue currency.

Now with insufficient physical silver reserves to back up their note issues, foreign-owned and Chinese banks and financial institutions reduced extension of credit, curtailed their loan programs and called-in existing loans. This reduced economic activity and had a highly deflationary effect on the Chinese currency. This further discouraged Chinese exports and resulted in a continuous trade deficit. Cheap agricultural produce flooded into China while silver flowed out.

=== 1935 currency reform ===
In 1935, the Nationalist government imposed a reform to replace the silver standard with the foreign exchange standard, in which a new paper currency, namely Chinese National Currency (CNC), was created. The government pledged to establish an independent Central Bank to act as the reserve bank and to create a supervisory committee with responsible members from the business community to oversee the money supply. However, none of these promises was fulfilled. Instead it paved ways for the government to expand money supply without constraints.

The initial inflation after abandoning the silver standard was moderate. In Shanghai, wholesale prices dropped 23% from 1931 to 1934, then fell another 1% by 1935, but rose 24% over the following two years. However, in 1937, with the outbreak of the Second Sino-Japanese War, government spending surged for war efforts. The paper standard and inflation weakened the Chinese as they had to deplete silver reserves, which could have been used for war financing, for maintaining the currency.

== Second Sino-Japanese War ==
Wartime inflation in Chinese cities, 1938–1945

Inflation in wartime China
Year	Nationalist		Communist	Japanese
Year	Chongqing	Chengdu	Fuping	Tianjin
1938	126	128	100	143
1939	220	225	272	232
1940	569	665	1,092	506
1941	1,576	1,769	899	1,099
1942	4,408	4,559	1,469	3,453
1943	13,298	14,720	9,774	14,362
1944	43,050	56,965	34,483	284,302
1945	156,195	170,379	54,601	9,740,248

=== Nationalist China ===
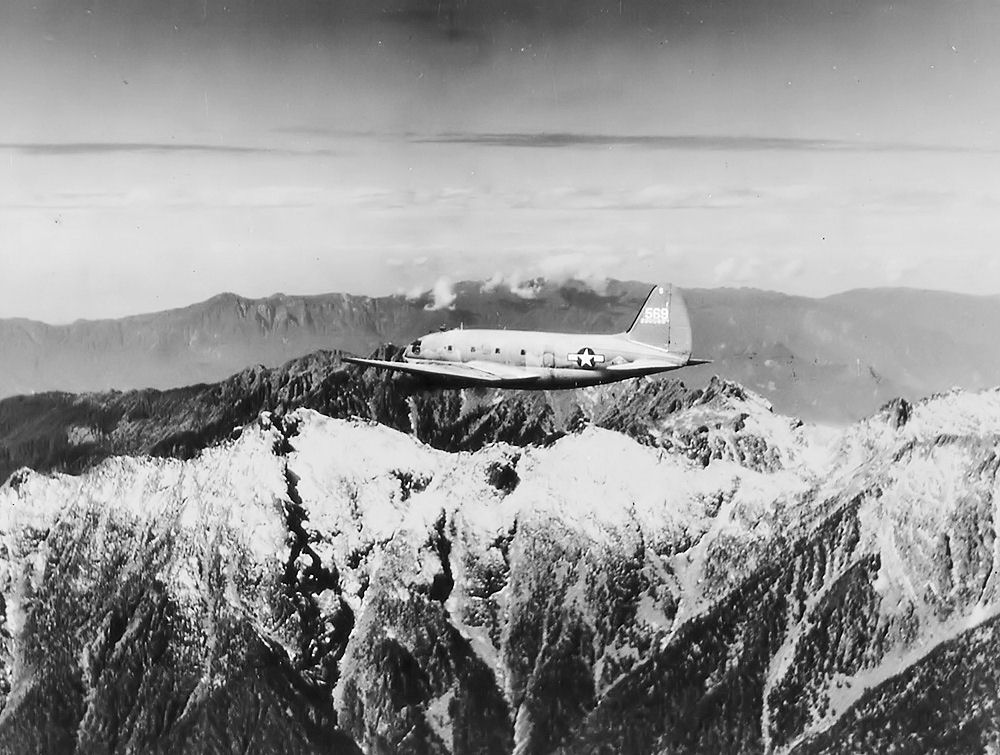
The Hump was the only route of imports for China in 1942–1944

Starting in July 1937, the Japanese military advanced through northern and eastern China, forcing the Nationalist government to retreat inland and abandon significant manufacturing and agricultural regions, as well as key transport hubs for imports and exports. This retreat, combined with Japanese blockades of Chinese transport routes, led to immediate price surges in Free China. Each successive Japanese victory exacerbated the situation. For instance, the fall of Wuhan and Guangzhou in late 1938 caused import prices to rise by 72%. The Japanese invasion of Guangxi in late 1939 nearly doubled import prices in Chongqing. In contrast, locally produced goods, including food and agricultural raw materials, maintained stable prices until 1938, supported by a robust harvest in Sichuan that year. However, from 1939 onwards, the prices of both imported and local goods began to rise in tandem as around five million refugees moved westward into Free China.

Since the start of the war, the Chinese government began funding its efforts through the issuance of war bonds, which initially enjoyed strong public support. By late 1938, government spending expanded not only for the war effort but also for reconstruction and the development of inland industries and transport infrastructure. This expansion aimed to reinforce infrastructure and sustain the war effort within the remaining Chinese-controlled territories. Consequently, government spending increased by 33%, despite the administration now managing only about half of the country. However, public confidence in war bonds waned, leading to a decline in bond sales since 1938. Additionally, the limited new taxes, which were not introduced until late 1939, failed to offset the government's excessive spending. As a result, the budget deficit continued to grow unchecked. With limited tax revenue from occupied regions and no bond market, China relied on banking institutions to fund deficits, leading to monetary expansion.

Inflation, previously moderate, surged after the Pacific War began. After the Japanese attack on Pearl Harbor in 1941, Japan quickly seized the whole of Shanghai and, in 1942, cut off the Burma Road, a crucial supply route for China. This led to a 50% decrease in imports in 1942 compared to the previous year. Despite efforts to compensate with The Hump air transport route over the Himalayas, by 1944, China was only receiving 6% of the total imports it had in 1937. Additionally, rice production in southern China faced unfavourable outcomes, although wheat and barley production in Henan and Hebei saw slight increases. Due to administrative failures, the Nationalist government struggled to enforce price control measures, despite issuing decrees to this effect. None of the government's strategies addressed the need to curb its own budget deficit, which continued to generate inflation.

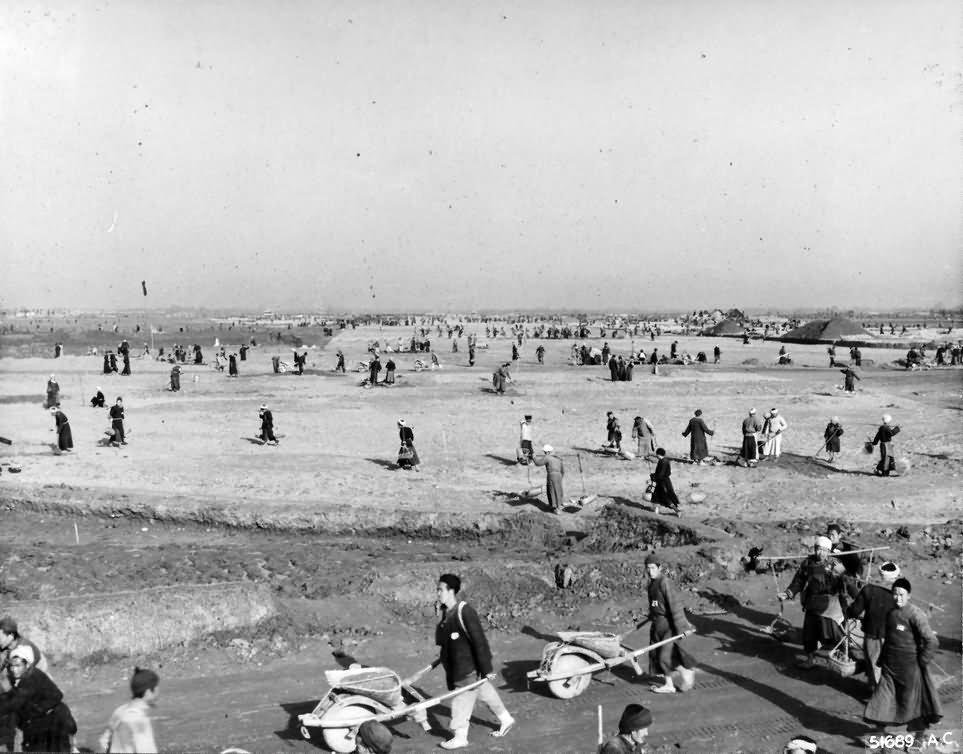
Building B-29 bases in China, February 1944

Although American shipment of gold to China played a critical role in reducing inflation, China's insistence on the official exchange rate of CNC created serious tension with its major ally, the United States. The US Department of the Treasury was also unhappy with the Chinese government's handling of the sale of gold that the United States had supplied to China.

American military operations in China also added to the financial difficulty of China. Besides providing food and lodging for US forces, China was responsible for constructing and maintaining military airfields, including costly B-29 bomber bases, which far exceeded initial budgets, costing C$79.9 billion CNC. In 1943, the US offered to cover some expenses in US dollars at an official 20:1 exchange rate, but as the Chinese currency devalued sharply, the agreement became unsustainable. By 1945, the currency's value dropped to 1/2,500 of its pre-war level, with even more severe inflation at major bases like Kunming. This led to the eventual abandonment of the 20:1 rate for payments to US forces. Payments from the US ceased after a final US$45 million settlement for late 1944, forcing China to cover expenses, which accounted for 15%–22% of its fiscal spending. From 1942 to 1945, China disbursed C$246 billion for US military aid, about 7% of its total military expenditures.

Compared with Tianjin under Japanese rule, Shanghai maintained price stability between 1937 and 1941

=== Shanghai ===
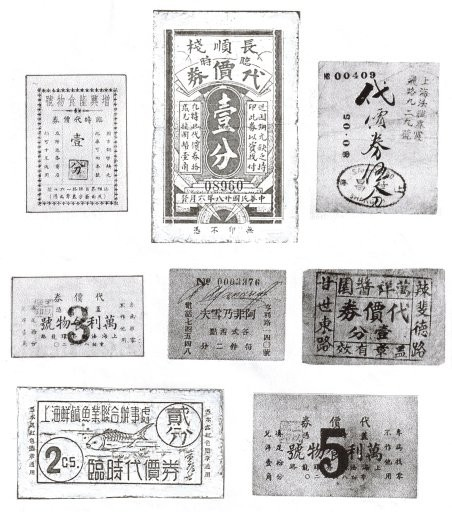
Emergency banknotes issued by various Chinese shops in Shanghai during 1937–1941

Between 1937 and 1941, Shanghai remained prosperous, due to foreign protection. In Shanghai, international connections helped it recover quickly as a trade hub. By 1938, after initial setbacks due to the Sino-Japanese War, imports had rebounded from 3.76 billion yuan in 1938 to 34.1 billion yuan by 1941. Exports also rose from 2.22 billion yuan in 1938 to 19.29 billion yuan in 1941.

However, the city constantly saw a shortage of rice. Traditionally sustained by the surplus from nearby Zhejiang and Jiangsu provinces, Shanghai had to import more rice from Saigon due to conflicts in neighbouring areas. While rice prices stabilised when transport links with inland China were restored in 1938, they surged again in 1939 as the Japanese military began forcibly requisitioning rice from surrounding provinces. By 1940, Shanghai was entirely reliant on rice imports from Southeast Asia.

The economic boom of wartime Shanghai was marked by speculative behaviour and a lack of regulation. People hoarded rice and other materials, which led to daily inflation. By 1940, the price of fine rice had grown to four times the pre-war price. In 1939, stock market activity became uncontrollable, and trading of war-related commodities like cotton drove prices up. Cotton that sold for 1,000 yuan per bale in September 1939 doubled to 2,000 yuan by May 1940. However, the French surrender to Germany in June 1940 led to the collapse of inflated prices. This resulted in the overnight bankruptcy of over 50 import-export firms and steep declines in stock values.

Although factories attempted to provide substitutes for workers, these efforts were insufficient to maintain a decent standard of living due to rampant price hikes of rice and rents. This led to a surge in protests, demonstrations, and violent crimes. Labour movements increased significantly, rising from 21 instances in 1938 to 282 in 1941. Following the Japanese capture of Shanghai in December 1941, inflation in the city further worsened, unemployment rose, and production declined, as a result of inadequate supplies under the Japanese rationing system.

=== Occupied China ===
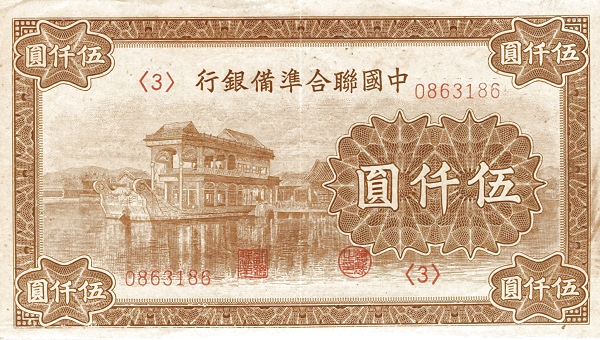
5000-yuan United Reserve Bank note in 1945

Wholesale price index in Shanghai surged after Japanese occupation in 1941

Despite its military success, Japan did not outline any specific plan for China until late 1938, when the Japanese premier declared the intent to establish a New Order in East Asia. A key aspect of this New Order was currency control. However, Japan failed to allocate sufficient funding to support the issuance of stable, credible currencies that could gain broad acceptance. Additionally, the International Settlement of Shanghai, which was the banking centre of China, maintained its neutral status until 1941. This neutrality allowed a free currency market to continue operating independently of directives from Tokyo or Chongqing.

Japanese puppet states in occupied China, 1937-1941

Japan viewed north China as an extension of its homeland, planning to integrate its currency into the yen bloc. The Central Bank of Manchuria, established in 1932, issued yen-pegged yuan banknotes by 1935. In east Hebei, under a puppet regime created by the He-Umezu Agreement of 1935, the Japanese circulated Bank of Chosen notes. These notes, used heavily from July 1937, depreciated due to overuse. To stabilise the situation, Japan's puppet the Provisional Government of the Republic of China established the United Reserve Bank in March 1938, issuing new notes that replaced the Bank of Chosen notes.

The new notes depreciated due to overprinting, leading to inflation. Japanese businessmen also avoided the currency, as it was difficult to convert even to yen. By December 1938, the British Municipal Council of Tianjin, under Japanese pressure, banned the use of CNC. From 1938 to 1941, the note issuance grew by 450%, exacerbating inflation. The Japanese effectively attracted deposits to these puppet banks by offering higher interest rates. This allowed the Japanese to collect CNC for international trades. Additionally, from 1939 onwards, the Japanese Noborito Research Institute engaged in large-scale counterfeiting, producing approximately 4 billion yuan to bolster Japan's war efforts. In early May 1940, Chongqing gave up on efforts to maintain the value of CNC, following significant Japanese purchases of foreign exchange with CNC. By late 1940, the value of FRB notes had surpassed that of CNC notes. In 1941, FRB notes became the primary currency in occupied northern China.

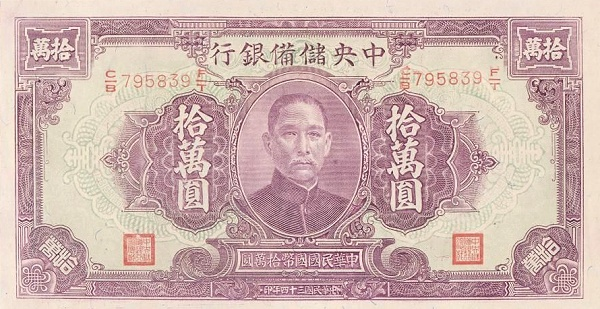
100,000-yuan CRB banknote in 1945

In central and southern China, no immediate effort was made to establish a new currency or banking system, as Japan aimed to treat central and southern China more like foreign territories, similar to Hong Kong. The Japanese military used Military Yen. This currency lacked security and was not backed by reserves, but it was difficult to refuse when presented by Japanese forces. By mid-1940, over 100 million yen was reported to circulate, with estimates reaching up to 600 million. The first significant attempt to introduce a puppet bank was the Huaxing Commercial Bank in May 1939, but it lacked reserves and the currency saw limited use. It was only in 1941, under the Wang Jingwei regime, that serious efforts were made to introduce a new currency in central China.

The Japanese military, reluctant to abandon the use of military yen, was slow to respond to Wang Jingwei's efforts. The depreciation of the CNC slowed in late 1940, giving the Wang regime enough time to secure funding for the new bank, which was eventually founded as the Central Reserve Bank (CRB) in January 1941. In response, Chongqing warned Shanghai businesspeople that accepting the currency would be considered treason. Assassination attempts were made by both the Wang regime and the Nationalist government until CNC was fully banned and the Japanese government agreed to replace military yen with CRB notes, following the Pearl Harbor attack. Despite this, the Wang regime struggled to maintain the value of its currency, and was forced to ban exchanges with FRB notes in northern China, allowing currency transfers only through eleven official banks.

=== Communist China ===
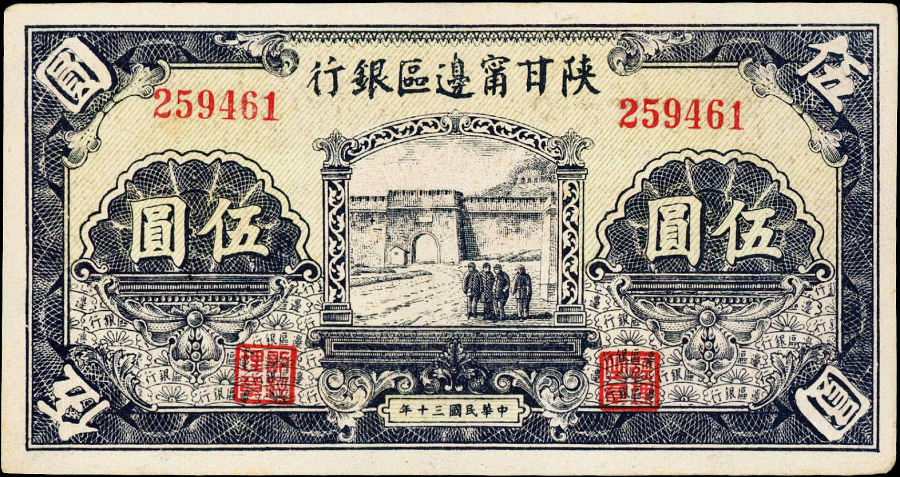
A 5-yuan Communist banknote in 1941

The Communist-controlled areas suffered less from the inflation as they each issued their own currencies and had a self-sufficient economy. Prior to 1942, the Communist-controlled areas in Shandong primarily relied on CNC, which was exchangeable for British Pound Sterling and US dollars, with Communist-issued currencies pegged to CNC. However, following the outbreak of the Pacific War in 1941, the Japanese authorities banned CNC in territories under their control. They dumped hundreds of millions of CNC to acquire essential war supplies, posing a risk of depleting valuable resources from Communist-controlled areas. In response, the Communists decided to prohibit CNC usage. In 1943, the Communist government in Shandong established the Bureau of Industry and Commerce to stabilise their own currency. By purchasing strategic materials and providing financial support to agricultural and industrial production, the Bureau effectively curbed price hikes. Faced with significant inflation, the Communists allegedly planted and sold opium to alleviate their financial difficulty, which supported their currency.

== Civil War ==
=== Nationalist China ===
Depreciation of Chinese National Currency, 1946-1948 (Jan 1946 as 100)

Postwar financial statistics of CNC
Date		Market rate (CNC per US$)	Price index
1946	June	2,665	378,217
1946	December	6,063	681,563
1947	March	14,000	1,386,593
1947	June	36,826	2,905,700
1947	September	50,365	4,635,700
1947	December	149,615	10,063,000
1948	March	449,620	32,576,900
1948	June	2,311,250	197,690,000
1948	September	8,683,000	558,900,000

As the war came to a sudden end in August 1945, the Chongqing government was ill-prepared to make the transition to a stable peacetime economy and currency. The military failures of the late war period and the loss of much of its already inadequate income led to a rapid acceleration of hyperinflation. At the end of the war, the industrial output of non-occupied China had dropped to just over 12% of its prewar production. The rural economy was severely affected by manpower shortages, excessive taxes, and natural disasters.

However, the Nationalist government continued high military spending to counter the Communist threat. This led to a budget deficit and an increase in currency circulation. From 1946 to 1948, military expenses made up about 60% of total government spending. Despite rising revenues, they fell far short of matching expenditure, leading to a growing deficit that doubled tax revenue after 1946. The shortfall was largely addressed by printing more money. The government's reliance on printing money to fund the war effort led to hyperinflation, with wholesale prices in Shanghai increasing fivefold from September 1945 to February 1946, and then thirtyfold the following year.

==== 1948 currency reform ====
Financial statistics of gold yuan (GY)
Date		Note issue (in million GY)	Market rate (GY per US$)	Price index
1948	31 August	296.8	4	100
1948	30 November	3,204.3	42	1,365
1949	28 February	59,663.5	2,980	-
1949	25 April	2,037,105.7	813,880	112,490
1949	31 July	125,124,637.2	-	-

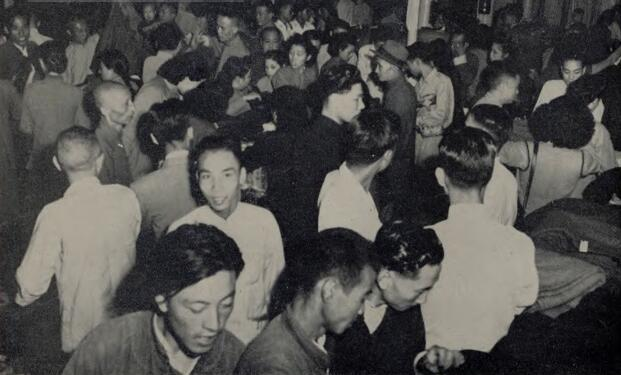
Panic buys in Shanghai after the 1948 currency reform

On 19 August 1948, a currency reform was implemented with the aim of achieving price stability by changing the currency standard. CNC was replaced by the Chinese gold yuan (GY), with an exchange rate set at GY 1 for every CNC$3,000,000. The currency was said to be pegged at four to one dollar, backed by actual government assets. The government advised their citizens to exchange their silver or gold holdings for the new currency. Additionally, commodity prices were frozen at their 19 August levels, requiring government approval for any changes.

However, the government continued deficit spending, resulting in an excessive increase in money circulation. The loss of major cities, including Tianjin, Xuzhou, and Hankou, further lowered public morale. By October 1948, the circulation of the GY had reached nearly eight times the permitted maximum. The continued printing of money meant the reform failed to stabilise prices, leading to the new currency depreciating even faster than its predecessor CNC.

==== Failed price control attempt ====
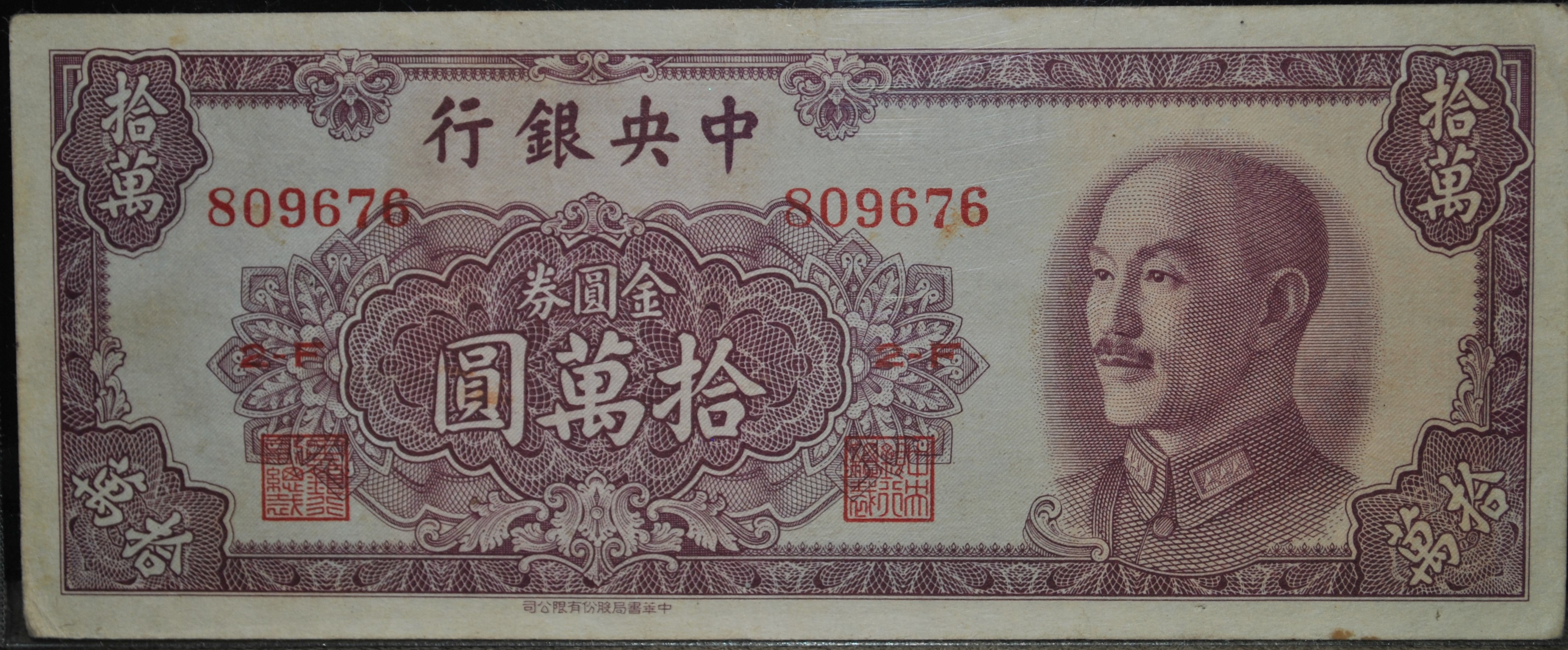
100,000-yuan Chinese gold yuan banknote in 1949

Chiang Kai-shek's son was appointed to oversee the implementation of price controls. However, these measures were applied only in Shanghai and proved effective for just two months. The introduction of the Gold Yuan was accompanied by significant fanfare as a supposed solution to economic problems, but sceptics argued that it merely removed six zeros from the value of the CNC. Initially set at four GY per US dollar, the exchange rate quickly fell under the pressures of inflation and speculation, returning to the CNC level from August 1948 by May 1949.

==== Currency substitution ====
The inflation, depreciating exchange rate of Nationalist currencies, and political instability in China created ideal conditions for currency substitution. The US dollar was popular as a store of value, but the open border with Hong Kong and the stability of the Hong Kong dollar (HKD) made it a preferred choice in port cities and southern China. The region's geography made it difficult to control the flow of people, goods, and currency between Hong Kong and China, especially since Hong Kong authorities were hesitant to impose restrictions that could affect their trade hub status. HKD was backed by foreign exchange reserves through a currency board, maintaining stable prices until late 1949. Around two-thirds of the increase in Hong Kong's note issue between 1945 and 1947 thus flowed into China.

=== Taiwan ===
During the Second Sino-Japanese War, Taiwan, as a Japanese colony, had to purchase Japanese debts through the purchase by the Bank of Taiwan. In 1945, the bank offered significant advance payments to the Japanese government, which contributed to the wartime inflation. In November 1945, Taiwan was handed over to the Nationalist government of China. The government attempted to isolate the former Japanese-controlled areas, such as Taiwan and Manchuria, from the mainland with new currencies. Therefore, they authorised the Bank of Taiwan to issue a new currency called Taiwan dollar, to replace the existing Japanese currency, yet without reserve backing, in May 1946. The bank soon became a key financier for the Taiwan Provincial Government and gave unsecured loans to state enterprises, which led to stead inflation in 1947 and early 1948.

In late 1948, the inflation on Taiwan spiked, as a result of the currency reform on the mainland. Despite the weakening of the Chinese gold yuan, the exchange rate with the Taiwan Dollar remained unchanged, attracting significant capital inflows that inflated the money supply. Adjusting the exchange rate caused an eightfold rise in capital outflow by November 1948, but December saw deflation at 9.01%. The Nationalists' weakening position on the mainland led to capital flight and resource transfers to Taiwan. By November 1948, the limit on gold yuan issuance was lifted due to rising deficits. Economic decline on the mainland further fuelled capital movement to Taiwan, shifting a November outflow of 23,277 million Taiwan Dollars to a major inflow of 214,495 million in December, representing 73.4% of that month's currency increase.

=== Manchuria ===
After Japan's surrender in 1945, the Communists focused on making Manchuria their base. In November 1945, they issued their own currency in Manchuria, which later competed with the Nationalist-backed currencies during the Chinese civil war. By late 1947, the Communists gained control by keeping their currency stable, unlike the Nationalists. A major factor behind their success was the prevention of private speculation through the sale of essential goods at controlled, low prices. The General Trade Bureau in Harbin, the only main city they controlled before 1948, helped keep prices steady by releasing goods like cotton cloth into the market.

=== Communist China ===
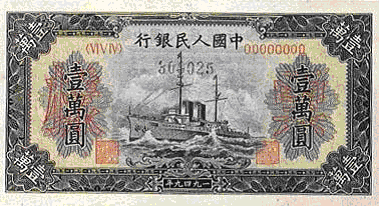
10,000-yuan renminbi issued in 1949

As the Communists advanced, the renminbi replaced the gold yuan as the legal currency at an exchange rate of 100,000:1 on October 1, 1949. Military expenditures in 1949 drove significant renminbi issuance, contributing to high inflation, although not as extreme as in the Nationalist China. By March 1950, stabilisation efforts were underway, despite wholesale prices being over 200 times their mid-1949 levels. Fiscal data for 1949 was fragmented, as there was no unified national budget, with budgetary details only available for regional administrations. In northern China, 69.5% of April 1949 expenditures came from deficit spending, with money issuance exceeding stable levels by 14-16 times. Fiscal pressures increased as the Communists pushed in the south. Manchuria reported a balanced budget, while Shanghai had severe deficits, peaking at over 87% of expenditures in mid-1949. National estimates for the 1949 deficit suggest it was substantial, ranging from 47.74% to as high as two-thirds of total spending. To combat inflation, the Communist regime used a variety of strategies focused on indexation, state-controlled trade, and fiscal consolidation.

==== Commodity control ====
Introduced in April 1949, the parity deposit system indexed bank deposits to a commodity unit representing local consumption patterns. This protected the real value of deposits from inflation and helped stabilize the velocity of money, reducing the pressure of panic spending. To ensure real wages kept up with inflation, the government implemented a wage parity system in 1949, later replacing it with "wage points" in 1950. These points represented shares of a basket of goods, linking wages to the cost of essential items like food, cloth, and fuel. State Trading Companies were central to controlling inflation by manipulating the supply of key commodities like grain, cotton, and coal. The state trading companies purchased goods through taxes, state enterprises, and private sector output, and used these resources to intervene in urban markets. By doing so, they sought to lower prices, withdraw currency from circulation, and combat speculation. While their operations were complex and often met with resistance, especially in rural areas, they did help stabilize urban prices to some extent.

==== Capital control ====
On May 28, 1949, the Shanghai Military Control Commission declared the Renminbi as the only legal currency. The decree required all financial transactions, tax payments, and contracts to use the Renminbi, banning silver yuan, gold yuan, and foreign currencies for settlements. The conversion of gold yuan to Renminbi began on May 30 at a rate of 1 Renminbi to 100,000 gold yuan and concluded by June 5, with over 35 trillion gold yuan converted, effectively eliminating it from Shanghai. Speculation on the silver yuan surged as many businessmen doubted the Renminbi's stability and expected it to fail like the gold yuan. Between June 1 and June 10, 1949, the black market price of the Yinyuan tripled, sparking inflation. At its height, silver yuan trading was widespread, and the Renminbi was either rejected or only partially accepted in the wholesale market. To stabilise the Renminbi, Mayor Yi Chen's government released 410,000 silver yuan into the market on 5–6 June, but this did not reduce prices. On 10 June, stricter measures were implemented: authorities seized the Securities Exchange Building—an epicentre of speculation—and arrested over 1,000 dealers, with more than 200 receiving punishment. The silver yuan price dropped rapidly, and speculation ceased.

==== Budget control ====
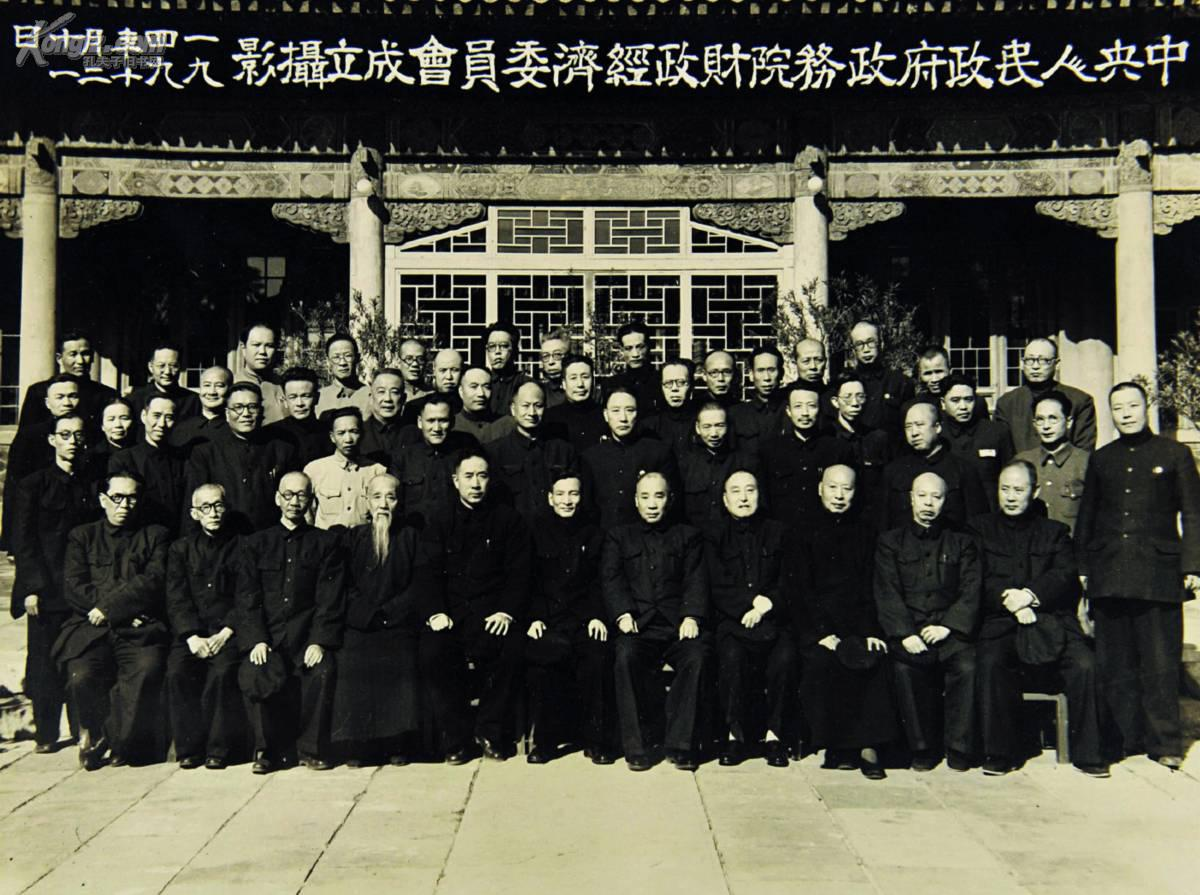
Formation of the Financial and Economic Committee of the State Council of the People's Republic of China in October 1949

Despite the state trading companies' role, the government's fiscal policies were crucial. The March 3, 1950 fiscal consolidation helped control government spending, which had been inflated by military costs and public sector wages. By constraining spending and balancing the budget, the government aimed to reduce inflationary pressures, leading to a gradual stabilisation of the currency and prices by mid-1950. In March 1950, a government decree required state organs and military funds to be deposited in state banks, limiting unnecessary spending and curbing the velocity of money. This measure, combined with a sharp drop in private bank deposit turnover, helped reduce inflation and prevent further price hikes.

== Aftermath ==
=== Communist revolution of China ===
Wartime inflation was particularly challenging for salaried individuals like teachers, bureaucrats, and military officers. However, the severity of the issue escalated significantly in the final stages of the war. For those with fixed incomes, survival often led to corruption. Hyperinflation also undermined the appeal of modern banking, as people chose to hold tangible assets such as gold, silver, jewellery, foodstuffs, and foreign currencies to safeguard against the worsening inflation. These severe economic conditions eroded the support of the Nationalists, especially among the urban middle class, which had traditionally been its base. As inflation worsened, disillusionment with Chiang Kai-shek's economic policies grew, leading to widespread hostility or indifference toward the Nationalists. The government's attempt to control inflation through administrative measures only worsened the situation, making the Nationalist policies extremely unpopular and causing it to lose credibility and support.

Milton Friedman noted that bureaucracy, corruption, and poor financial management, which caused the collapse of the money market and hyperinflation, were significant factors in the Nationalists' defeat in the civil war. The severe hyperinflation in China, coupled with the Communists' ability to control it, aided their rise to power. During the inflation in the 1960s and late 1980s, the Communist leaders exhibited significant aversion of inflation.

=== Restoring financial stability on Taiwan ===
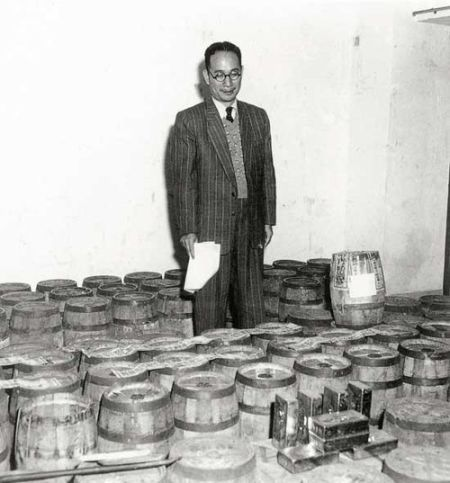
Gold reserve for Chinese gold yuan was secretly transported to Taiwan

Starting in late 1948, Chiang Kai-shek covertly moved China's gold reserves from Shanghai to Taiwan, estimated at 113.6 to 115.2 tonnes, as his government gradually lost the civil war. British journalist George Vine witnessed the transfer on 2 December 1948 from her room at the Peace Hotel. Although his account was met with scepticism, it sparked a nationwide bank run. Later, the New Taiwan dollar was introduced, replacing the old Taiwan dollar at an exchange rate of one to 40,000. The estimated 800,000 taels of gold, along with US$10 million brought from Shanghai, provided essential stability to a nation that had experienced severe hyperinflation since 1945.

Due to the relocation of the central government to Taiwan at the end of 1949, the Bank of Taiwan had to make even more advance payments for the central government agencies. Despite the reform on Taiwan dollar, the budget deficit continued to worsen, placing even greater pressure on prices. Yet, the outbreak of the Korean War on 25 June 1950 led to the immediate resumption of US aid to Taiwan. This assistance allowed the Nationalist government to reduce the budget deficit and ultimately bring an end to the hyperinflation.

== See also ==
- Chinese Communist Revolution
- Economic warfare
