= Mengjiang Bank =

Former central bank

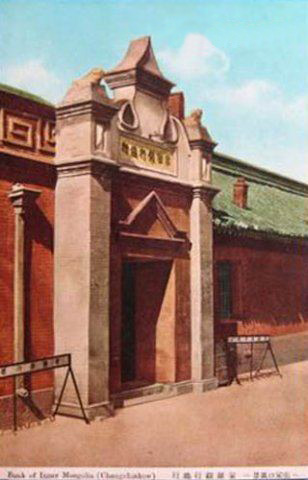
Entrance of the Mengjiang Bank in Kalgan, late 1930s or early 1940s

The Mengjiang Bank, also Meng Chiang Bank or Bank of Inner Mongolia (Chinese: 蒙疆銀行), was a central bank of the Japan-supported government of Mengjiang that governed Inner Mongolia during early years of the Second Sino-Japanese War, from late 1937 to early 1941.

It was thus one of the "puppet" banks of issue established by the Japanese occupation forces, together with the Central Bank of Manchou (1932-1945), United Reserve Bank (1938-1945), Huaxing Commercial Bank (1938-1941) and Central Reserve Bank (1941-1945).

== Overview ==
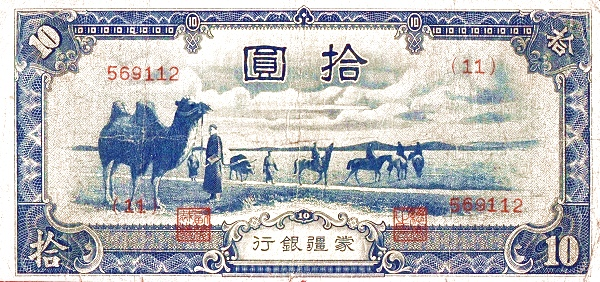
10 yuan note, 1944

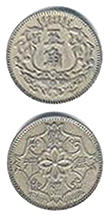
Coin of the Menjiang Bank, 1938

A predecessor of the Mengjiang Bank, the Chahar Commercial Bank, was established in the interwar period in Kalgan (now Zhangjiakou), then the capital of Chahar Province in Inner Mongolia. After conquering the region in the summer of 1937, the Japanese occupation forces established the region of South Chahar or Cha-Nan, and in 27 September 1937 established the Chanan Bank as a bank of issue fully owned by the Chanan occupation government, which started operations in Kalgan on 1 October 1937 then opened branches in several cities of the region such as Hohhot.

The Chanan Bank turned out to be short-lived, however, and was soon reorganized as the Mengjiang Bank, established on 23 November 1937 and opened on 1 December 1937, on Gulou West Street in Kalgan. In addition to banknotes, the Mengjiang Bank minted coins, which had a face partly written in Mongolian script with dating referring to the number of years since the era of Genghis Khan.

By 1945, the Mengjiang Bank had issued over 4.2 billion yuan in banknotes and coins. As with other puppet banks, the bank's staff was mostly Chinese, but most executives, consultants, advisors, and foreign exchange managers were Japanese.

== Leadership ==
- Bao Yueqing, President November 1937 - July 1939
- Bashar Golda, President July 1939 - March 1942
- Munakata Hisaki, President March 1942 - April 1945
- Yusuke Suzuki, President April - August 1945

== See also ==
- Chinese National Currency
- Japanese military currency (1937–1945)
- Chinese hyperinflation
