= Tsuyee Pei =

Chinese banker (1893–1982)

- 貝祖貽

Governor of the Central Bank of China
- In office 6 February 1946 – 28 February 1947
- President: Chiang Kai-shek
- Preceded by: Yu Hung-chun
- Succeeded by: Chang Kia-ngau

Personal details
- Born: 1893 Wu County, Jiangsu, Qing China
- Died: 27 December 1982 (aged 88–89) Manhattan, New York City, United States
- Spouse(s): Lien Kwun; Aileen C. Pei
- Children: 6; including I. M. Pei
- Education: Suzhou University

Tsuyee Pei or Pei Tsu-yi (Chinese: 貝祖貽; 1893 – 27 December 1982) was a Chinese banker.

Pei was a native of Wuxian, Jiangsu, born in 1893. He attended Shanghai's Chengzhong Middle School, founded by Ye Chengzhong, and completed his degree at Suzhou University in 1911. Aged 23, Pei began working for the Bank of China's Beijing office. After two years, he was transferred to the Guangzhou branch.

While in Guangzhou, Pei refused to lend funds to forces allied with Sun Yat-sen. He soon fled the aftermath of the Second Revolution, to establish a branch of the Bank of China in Hong Kong. Pei returned to mainland China in 1927, based out of the Bank of China's Shanghai office. Having gained experience in arbitrage while in Hong Kong and learned about banking practices in England and the United States, Pei subsequently ordered Bank of China branches in commerce and treaty ports to engage in foreign exchange operations. This action ended the monopoly of foreign banks and financial brokers in the field of foreign remittances in China and led the Bank of China to establish several international branches.

Between 1934 and 1935, Pei helped plan Chinese financial reform initiatives, such as the November 1935 introduction of the fabi, a paper currency which separated China's finance sector from the silver standard. He spent most of the Second Sino-Japanese War in Chongqing, where the Nationalist government was based. During the war, the Central Bank of China no longer accepted the exchange of local currency for foreign currencies. However, Pei and the Bank of China partnered with the Hong Kong and Shanghai Banking Corporation to provide currency exchange services at the then-current rate. Pei's actions helped the fabi avoid collapse, as did the 1939 establishment of the Sino-British Stabilization Board, of which Pei was a member.

Pei was appointed acting general manager of the Bank of China in 1941 and, in this position, attended the 1944 Bretton Woods Conference, representing the Nationalist government. Between 1946 and 1947, he was a governor of the Central Bank of China. Pei traveled to the United States again in 1949, to seek support for the Nationalist government, which soon lost the Chinese Civil War and subsequently retreated to Taiwan. From 1952, Pei served as a director of C. V. Starr & Company, a holding company active in the American and Asian insurance markets. In 1959, he moved to the Shanghai Commercial Bank of Hong Kong, assuming a directorship position between 1962 and 1973.

Tsuyee Pei was married to Lien Kwun until her death, and later married Aileen C. Pei. His six children included sons Y. K., Y. T., and I. M. Pei, and daughters Cecelia Shen, Denise Sze and Patricia Tang. Pei died at Manhattan's Lenox Hill Hospital on 27 December 1982, aged 89. In addition to his second wife and children, Tsuyee Pei was survived by seven siblings, four brothers and three sisters.
