= Silver Purchase Act =

Silver Purchase Act may refer to one of two federal laws of the United States:

- Sherman Silver Purchase Act of 1890
- American Silver Purchase Act of 1934
