= Huaxing Commercial Bank =

Former central bank

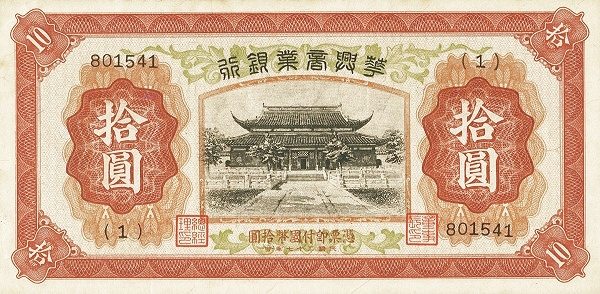
10 yuan banknote of the Huaxing Commercial Bank, 1938

The Huaxing Commercial Bank or Huaxing Bank, sometimes transliterated Hua-Hsing (Chinese: 華興商業銀行), was a central bank of the Japan-supported Reformed Government of the Republic of China that governed the Jiangnan region of China during early years of the Second Sino-Japanese War. It started operations in Shanghai in May 1938, was reorganized as a mere commercial bank following the creation of the Central Reserve Bank in January 1941, and stopped operating in August 1945.

It was thus one of the "puppet" banks of issue established by the Japanese occupation forces, together with the Central Bank of Manchou (1932-1945), Mengjiang Bank (1937-1945), United Reserve Bank (1938-1945), and Central Reserve Bank (1941-1945).

== Overview ==
Huaxing Commercial Bank was established on 1 May 1938 with initial capital of 50 million yuan. The Reformed Government subscribed for half, while the other half came from the Industrial Bank of Japan, Bank of Taiwan, Bank of Chōsen, Mitsubishi Bank, Sumitomo Bank, and Mitsui Bank. Liang Hongzhi was appointed as the bank's President, and Washio Isoichi (Japanese: 鷲尾磯一) as Vice President. It opened on 16 May 1938 in the Hongkou district of Shanghai. On 26 May 1938, the bank established a branch in Nanjing at No. 233 Zhuque Road, the former location of Shanghai Commercial and Savings Bank. As with other puppet banks, the bank's staff was mostly Chinese, but most executives, consultants, advisors, and foreign exchange managers were Japanese.

The currency issued by the Huaxing Bank, known as Huaxing yuan or Huaxing-quan, was forced to circulate in the areas under the jurisdiction of the Reformed Government. It was issued in the form of banknotes and coins. On 19 July 1939, the Huaxing yuan was pegged to the pound sterling at the rate of 6 pence to 1 yuan.

In January 1941, with the creation of the Central Reserve Bank, the monetary role of the Huaxing Bank was terminated. Its currency was exchanged for that issued by the new institution, at a rate of 100 Huaxing yuans to 240 Central Reserve yuans.

The bank's president Liang Hongzhi was arrested in Suzhou on 19 October 1945, transferred to Shanghai and charged for treason, sentenced to death on 21 June 1946 and executed on 9 November 1946, aged 65.

== See also ==
- Chinese National Currency
- Japanese military currency (1937–1945)
- Chinese hyperinflation
