= United Reserve Bank =

Former central bank

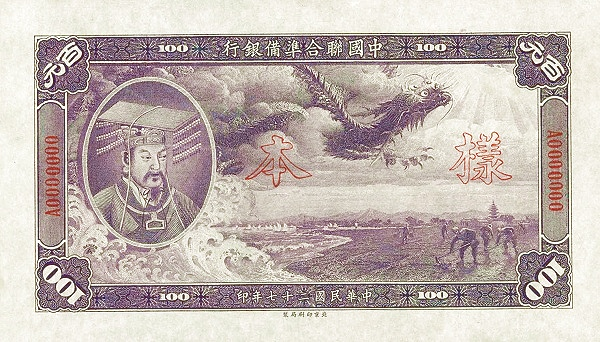
100 dollar note of 1938, featuring the Yellow Emperor

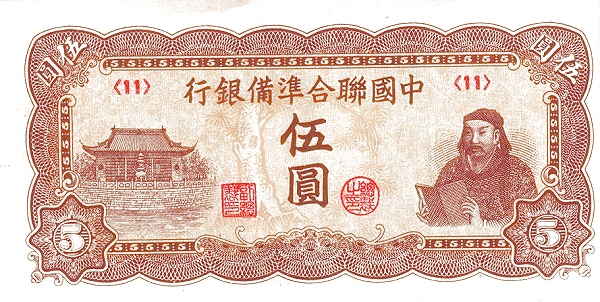
5 yuan note of 1944, featuring Yue Fei

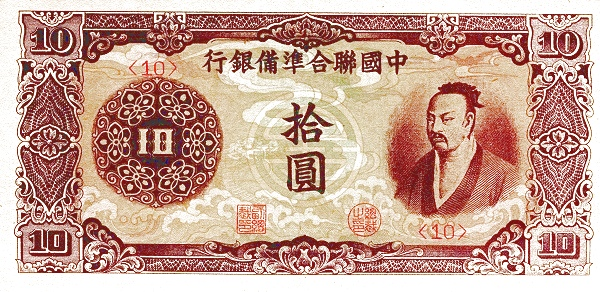
10 yuan note of 1944, featuring Emperor Yao

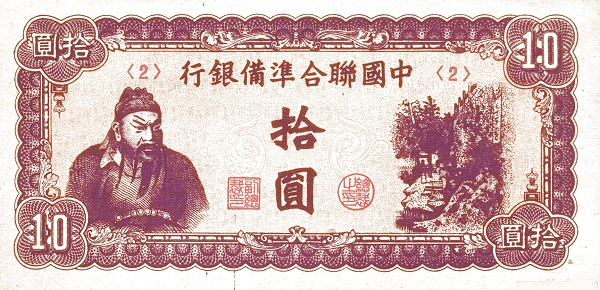
10 yuan note of 1945, featuring Guan Yu

The United Reserve Bank, sometimes referred to as Federal Reserve Bank or Federated Reserve Bank (Chinese: 中國聯合準備銀行), was the central bank of the Japan-supported Provisional Government of the Republic of China (1937–1940) that governed North China in the early years of the Second Sino-Japanese War, and then of its successor the North China Political Council led by Wang Kemin.

Based in Peiping, it operated between March 1938 and August 1945. It was thus one of the "puppet" banks of issue established by the Japanese occupation forces, together with the Central Bank of Manchou (1932-1945), Mengjiang Bank (1937-1945), Huaxing Commercial Bank (1938-1941) and Central Reserve Bank (1941-1945).

== Overview ==
The bank was created on 10 March 1938 under the authority of Governor Wang Shijing, after a loss of confidence in the notes of the Bank of Chōsen which had previously been distributed by the Japanese occupation forces. It issued currency known as United Reserve Bank notes (lianyin-quan), which had the same value as the Chinese National Currency (fabi) and was pegged to the Japanese yen in the foreign exchange market.

In its early years, the bank issued notes featuring Confucius making a rude hand gesture, an act of sabotage by the bank's own staff. The issuance of "rude Confucius" notes was only terminated by the Japanese occupation forces between mid-1940 and early 1941.

Even after the Wang Jingwei Government created the Central Reserve Bank in 1940-1941, the United Reserve Bank kept operating and issuing currency in the North until the war's end. As with other puppet banks, the bank's staff was mostly Chinese, but most executives, consultants, advisors, and foreign exchange managers were Japanese.

== See also ==
- Japanese military currency (1937–1945)
- Chinese hyperinflation
