= Central Reserve Bank of China =

Former central bank

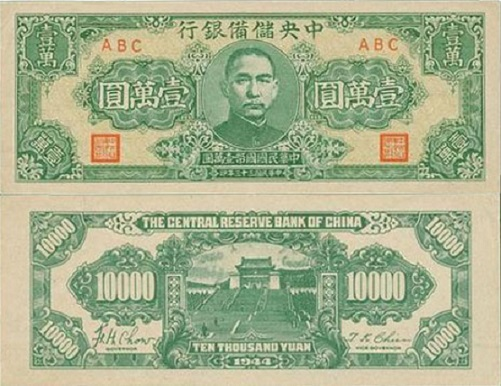
10,000-yuan note of the Central Reserve Bank, 1944

The Central Reserve Bank (Chinese: 中央儲備銀行) was the central bank of the Wang Jingwei regime that governed much of China during the Second Sino-Japanese War. Based in Nanjing and Shanghai, it operated between January 1941 and August 1945.

It was thus one of the "puppet" banks of issue established by the Japanese occupation forces, together with the Central Bank of Manchou (1932–1945), Mengjiang Bank (1937–1945), United Reserve Bank (1938–1945), and Huaxing Commercial Bank (1938–1941).

== Overview ==
The bank was formally created on 21 December 1940 and started operations on 6 January 1941 in Nanjing. It had initial capital of 100 million yuan, half of which was provided by the Ministry of Finance and the other half borrowed from Nissho Company and Huaxing Commercial Bank.

The intent was to bring an end to the monetary chaos that afflicted China under Japanese occupation and to make it part of the yen zone, as had been done in Taiwan with the Bank of Taiwan, Korea with the Bank of Chōsen, and Manchukuo with the Central Bank of Manchou. The Central Reserve Bank took over the monetary role previously granted to the Huaxing Commercial Bank in Shanghai, whereas the United Reserve Bank (in Peiping) and the Mengjiang Bank (in Kalgan) kept issuing their own money in North China. It issued "puppet currency" known in English as the Reserve Bank note (chubei-quan).

Confidence in the bank started to collapse in 1942, together with the prospects for Japanese victory in the Pacific War, leading to hyperinflation. Some banks refused to open accounts in the Central Reserve Bank's currency; in the case of the Bank of China, that led to violence against its agents. By the war's end, the Shanghai branches of Bank of China and Bank of Communications had fallen entirely under the Central Reserve Bank's operational control. As with other puppet banks, the bank's staff was mostly Chinese, but most executives, consultants, advisors, and foreign exchange managers were Japanese.

In August 1945, the Wang Jingwei regime fell and the Central Reserve Bank ceased to function. On 30 September 1945, the branch of the Central Reserve Bank in Osaka was closed by the American occupation authorities.

Banknotes issued by the Central Reserve Bank bear a portrait of Sun Yat-sen, as did the earlier notes issued by the Central Bank of the Republic of China under Chiang Kai-shek.

== See also ==
- Chinese National Currency
- Japanese military currency (1937–1945)
- Chinese hyperinflation
- Central Reserve Bank of El Salvador
- Central Reserve Bank of Peru
