= Central Bank of Manchou =

Defunct central bank of Manchukuo (1932–45)

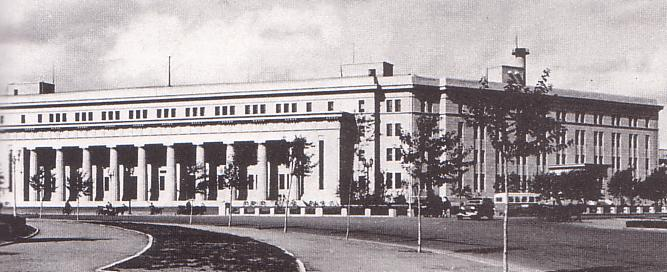
Central Bank of Manchou HQ in Xinjing, 1939

The Central Bank of Manchou (Chinese: 滿洲中央銀行; pinyin: Mǎnzhōu Zhōngyāng Yínháng; Wade–Giles: Man^{3}-chou^{1} Chung^{1}-yang^{1} Yin^{2}-hang^{2}; Japanese Hepburn: Manshū Chūō Ginkō), was the central bank of the Japan-sponsored state of Manchukuo, created in 1932.

It was thus one of the "puppet" banks of issue established by the Japanese occupation forces, together with the Mengjiang Bank (1937-1945), United Reserve Bank (1938-1945), Huaxing Commercial Bank (1938-1941) and Central Reserve Bank (1941-1945)

== Overview ==
The original plan for the bank can be traced to an October 1907 meeting between Takahashi Korekiyo, then president of the Yokohama Specie Bank, and Gotō Shinpei, then president of the South Manchuria Railway, in which Gotō proposed the establishment of a "colonization bank" (takushoku Ginkō) to finance the agricultural and industrial development of Japanese-controlled territories in Manchuria. Nearly a quarter-century later, the bank was established by the Bank of Manchukuo Act at Xinjing (today Changchun) on 11 June 1932, as a joint stock company with a capital of 30,000,000 yuan, with the government holding at least 25% and at most 50% at any time. The bank officially opened its doors for business on July 1 as the amalgamation of the four note-issuing banks active in Manchuria prior to that time, namely: the Bank of the Three Eastern Provinces, the Bank of Jilin, the Bank of Heilongjiang and the Frontier Bank, controlled by local warlord Zhang Zuolin. It was later revealed by audits that acquiring the four previous banks of Manchuria to be financially irresponsible as the Central Bank of Manchou held a deficit of 30,000,000 yuan in combined liabilities, but the action was deemed necessary as it was the only way to get rid of the overabundant currency issued by those banks in Manchuria in order to create a better foundation for the new Manchukuo yuan. When the Central Bank of Manchou was created it had a sufficient number of gold reserves for the new currency and paid out a dividend of 6% to investors, the stable value of the Manchukuo yuan was a major contributing factor for the development of the economy of Manchukuo.

The principal functions of the Bank were to act as a repository for the funds of the Manchukuo State Treasury, control the money market, unify the monetary system of Manchukuo and stabilize its currency. However, the Bank also engaged in ordinary banking business such as granting agricultural, industrial and commercial credit. In addition, the Bank served as Japan's agent in Manchukuo with the withdrawal of the Korean Bank of Chōsen from the region on 1 January 1936. With its head office in Xinjing, the Bank had nearly 140 branches throughout Manchukuo, China and Japan proper.

Pursuant to the Currency Law of 1932 which authorized the creation of the Bank, Manchukuo adopted a unit of currency, the Manchukuo yuan, containing 23.91 grams of pure silver, the metal on which Chinese currencies traditionally were based. The Bank was required by its charter to hold as a reserve against its issued notes at least 30% of the value of such issue in gold and silver bullion, reliable foreign currencies and deposits with foreign banks in gold and silver accounts. The Bank's notes were not required to be redeemable in specie. Due to worldwide fluctuations in the price of silver during the 1930s, Manchukuo took the yuan off a silver standard in 1935 and subsequently pegged the yuan to, and later reached approximate exchange parity with, the Japanese yen.

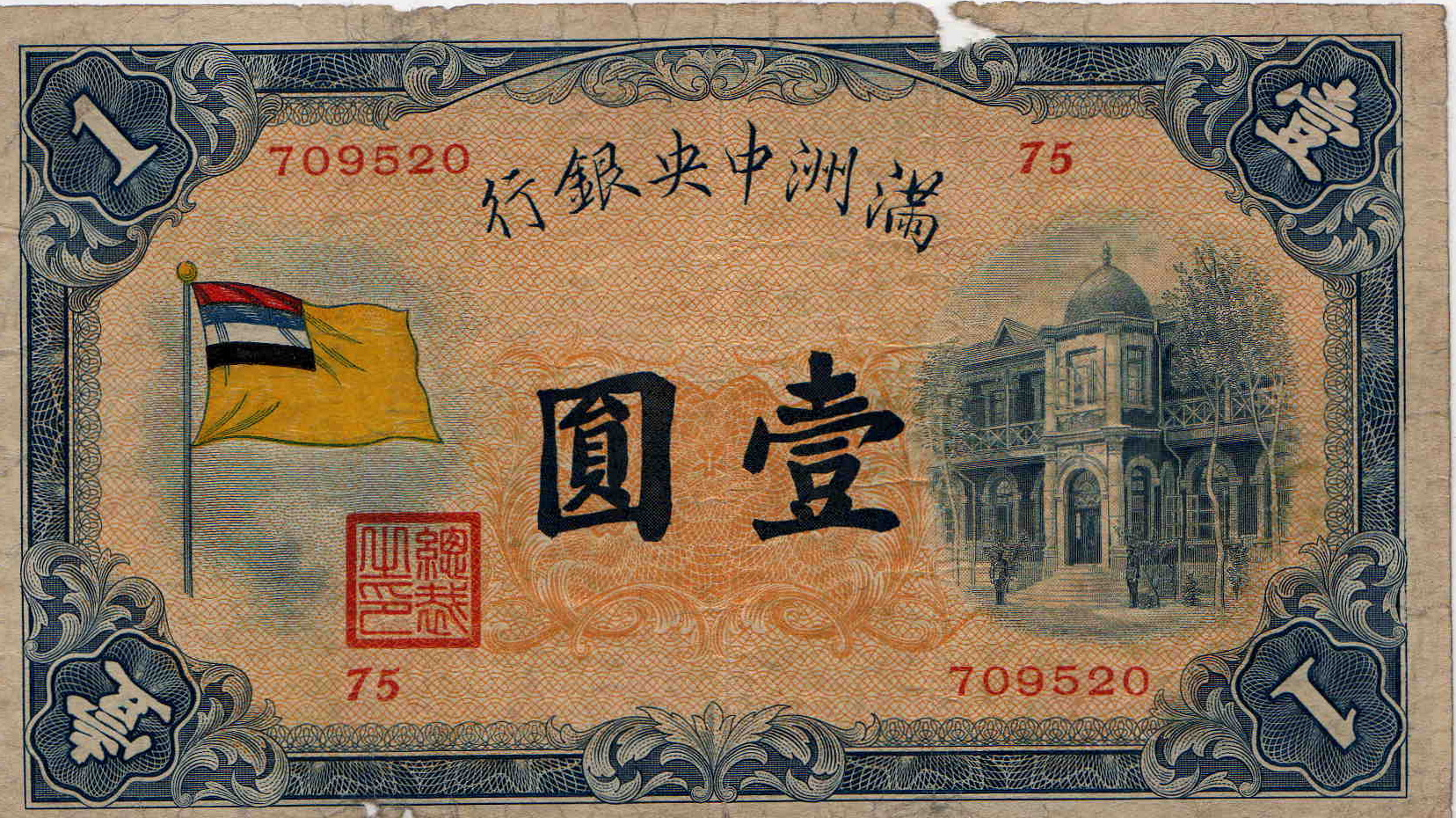
Central Bank of Manchou 1 yuan (1932)

The Bank initially issued approximately 150 million yuan in notes in 1932. By 1936, their aggregate value exceeded 200 million yuan, rising to 300 million in 1937, 400 million in 1938 and 620 million by the end of 1939. Throughout this period about half the value of the issued notes was backed by specie reserves. The notes issued were in five denominations, one hundred, ten, five and one yuan and five jiao (one-half yuan). To keep up with the inflationary pressures typically experienced by Japanese controlled areas towards the end of World War II, a 1,000 yuan note was issued in 1944. In 1948, after the end of World War II, approximately 12 billion yuan of Central Bank of Manchou notes were redeemed by the Tung Pei Bank.

As with Chinese coinage of the time, Manchukuo's coinage was based on the decimal system, one-tenth of the yuan being called the "jiao," one-hundredth called a "fen" and one-thousandth, a "li." Under the Currency Law the Central Bank of Manchukuo was authorized to mint 1 jiao and 5 fen coins of a nickel-copper alloy; and 1 fen and 5 li coins of a copper-tin-zinc alloy.

As with other puppet banks, the bank's staff was mostly Chinese, but most executives, consultants, advisors, and foreign exchange managers were Japanese.

=== Dating system ===
Manchukuo was established in March 1932 with Puyi assuming the title of Chief Executive of the new state using the era name of "Datong" (Wade-Giles: Ta-tung; 大同). Following the traditional dating system based on the year of the ruler's reign, the year 1932 became the first year of Datong . Two years later, Manchukuo was changed into an empire, with Puyi ascending the throne as Emperor of Manchukuo under the reign title, "Kangde" (Wade–Giles: Kang-te; 康德). Accordingly, 1934 was designated the first year of Kangde, while 1942 was the ninth year of Kangde.

== See also ==
- Chinese National Currency
- Japanese military currency (1937–1945)
- Chinese hyperinflation
