= Wang Shijing =

Chinese politician

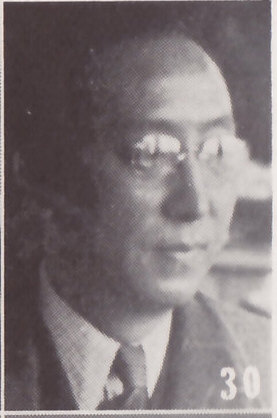
Wang Shijing as pictured in The Most Recent Biographies of Chinese Dignitaries

Wang Shijing (traditional Chinese: 汪時璟; simplified Chinese: 汪时璟; pinyin: Wāng Shíjǐng; Wade-Giles: Wang Shih-ching) (1887 - August 12, 1952) was a politician and banker in the Republic of China. He was an important politician during the Provisional Government of the Republic of China and the Wang Jingwei regime (Republic of China-Nanjing). He was born in Jingde, Anhui.

== Biography ==
Wang Shijing went to Japan where he graduated the Military Account School (ja:陸軍経理学校). Later he returned to China, he entered to the Beijing Government, and became a secretary to the Minister for Finance Wang Kemin and Zhang Gu (張孤). Wang Shijing also held the position of Head of the Factory of Clothing. In July 1927 he was appointed a member of the City Management Commission of Wuhan and Vice-Manager to the Hankou Branch of the Bank of China. Later he was promoted to be Manager to the Shenyang Branch of the Bank of China.

In December 1937 Wang Kemin established the Provisional Government of the Republic of China, Wang Shijing also participated in it. In March 1938 Wang Shijing was appointed Governor of the United Reserve Bank and member of the Japan-China Economical Conference. In March 1940 the Wang Jingwei regime was established, Wang Shijing was appointed Executive Member and Governor to the General Office for Finance (財務總署督辦) of the North China Political Council (華北政務委員會). Later he successively held the positions of Executive Member of the Commission for National Economy, Governor of the General Office for Economy (経済總署督辦) of the North China Political Council, etc.

In September 1944 he went to Japan as representative of the North China Political Council, and visited Wang Jingwei in hospital. He also signed an agreement for 3 hundred million yen loan from the Bank of Japan.

After Wang Jinwei regime had collapsed, Wang Shijing was arrested by Chiang Kai-shek's National Government at Beiping on December 5, 1945. He was sent to Nanjing. In next October 15 because of the charge of the treason and surrender to enemy (namely Hanjian), he was sentenced to life imprisonment on the Capital High Court. In January 1949 he was sent to the prison in Shanghai. After the People's Republic of China had established, his treatment wasn't changed.

Wang Shijing died in prison on August 12, 1952.

== Alma mater ==
Army Accounting School (Japan)

== Footnotes ==
- Xu Youchun (徐友春) (main ed.) (2007). Unabridged Biographical Dictionary of the Republic, Revised and Enlarged Version (民国人物大辞典 增订版). Hebei People's Press (Hebei Renmin Chubanshe; 河北人民出版社). ISBN 978-7-202-03014-1.
- Yu Zidao (余子道) (etc.) (2006). The Complete History of Wang's Fake Regime (汪伪政权全史). Shanghai People's Press (Shanghai Renmin Chubanshe; 上海人民出版社). ISBN 7-208-06486-5.
- History of Prison in Shanghai (上海监狱志) The Office of Shanghai's History (上海地方志办公室) Website
- Liu Shoulin (刘寿林) (etc.ed.) (1995). The Chronological Table of the Republic's Officer (民国职官年表). Zhonghua Book Company. ISBN 7-101-01320-1.
- The Biographies of Most Recent Chinese Important People (最新支那要人伝). Asahi Shimbun. 1941.
