= 1935 currency reform =

Monetary policy of the Nationalist Government of the Republic of China

The 1935 currency reform was a monetary policy announced by the Nationalist Government of the Republic of China on November 4, 1935. This reform marked the abandonment of the silver standard and the adoption of a gold standard, introducing the Chinese National Currency (CNC, or Fabi) as the unified national currency. The reform aimed to stabilise the economy by standardising the currency system under central government control.

== Background ==
=== Silver craze ===
Due to the Great Depression in 1929, global agricultural prices plummeted, worsening the disparity between the prices of industrial and agricultural products in rural China. This imbalance led to a flow of silver from rural areas to smaller cities and eventually into larger urban centers, which then faced an excess of capital. As countries like Britain and Japan abandoned the gold standard and enacted competitive devaluations to establish trade barriers, global silver prices began to rise. This increase triggered significant silver outflows from China's silver-standard-based economy. In June 1934, the U.S. passed a silver purchase act, which sharply drove up global silver prices through large-scale silver purchases, exacerbating China's silver outflows. This loss of silver led to deflation, surging interest rates, falling prices, and a sharp contraction of credit. The economic strain culminated in an unprecedented wave of business failures in Shanghai by early 1935. The Nationalist government only began restricting foreign exchange speculation in September 1934, and in October, imposed export duties on silver and trade balance taxes. However, these measures failed to curb silver outflows, making currency reform and the move away from the silver standard an urgent priority.

=== Diplomatic efforts ===
Before 1935, foreign banks in China had the right to issue currency. As China’s financial crisis peaked, the United Kingdom, the United States, and Japan engaged in diplomatic efforts to gain leverage over China's currency situation. Japan consistently resisted aid to China and opposed Western assistance, as it aimed to protect its interests in Manchuria, maintain relative peace with the Nationalist government, and prevent Western intervention in Chinese affairs. Additionally, Japan was still recovering from the Great Depression and lacked the funds to provide international loans. The UK sent economist Frederick Leith-Ross, who arrived in Shanghai on 21 September. This mission was part of Britain's broader plan to maintain friendly ties with both the U.S. and Japan. Britain sought to leverage economic assistance to pressure China into recognising Manchukuo while also urging China to sell silver to the U.S. to strengthen Anglo-American relations. However, the U.S. opposed Britain's plan to peg the new currency to the British pound, and Leith-Ross’s subsequent visit to Japan was met with a lukewarm reception. As a result, British efforts for aid faltered. In the U.S., domestic pressures made it difficult to directly adjust its silver policy, and internal divisions complicated aid efforts. The Treasury Department favored unilateral aid to China, whereas the State Department advocated for joint assistance with Britain. This indecision persisted until the onset of China's currency reform.

== Chinese responses ==
=== Controlling banks ===
To Chiang Kai-shek, the root cause of the financial crisis was the disunity in currency and financial issuance. Key financial institutions, primarily the Bank of China and the Bank of Communications, controlled by the powerful Jiangsu-Zhejiang financial clique, resisted government directives and refused full cooperation. Chiang, alongside Soong Tse-ven (the Governor of the Central Bank of China) and H.H. Kung, met in Hankou in February 1935 to discuss the takeover of financial institutions. In March, Kung launched a sudden intervention in Shanghai’s banking sector, while Soong replaced Zhang Jia'ao, an advocate for banking independence, as head of the Bank of China. By April, the government increased its shareholdings to exert greater control over the Central Bank, Bank of China, and Bank of Communications. The Nationalist government then moved to further control smaller financial institutions, known as the "Small Four Banks," including the Commercial Bank of China, Siming Bank, and Industrial Bank of China. They replaced bank managers and placed these banks' issuance rights under government supervision. That same year, Soong, Du Yuesheng, and Tang Shoumin joined the board of the Shanghai Bankers' Association, taking over leadership from the Jiangsu-Zhejiang clique. By 1936, they had secured control over the association’s leading banks, which held the majority of assets among its members, marking the end of Shanghai's financial independence from the government.

=== Limiting silver trade ===
In an effort to curb the outflow of silver, China imposed taxes on silver exports, which unintentionally encouraged smuggling and worsened the domestic economic situation. According to H.H. Kung's recollections, he had been planning the currency reform since the U.S. silver policy was announced. By June, the Nationalist government realised that Western assistance might not resolve the nation's issues, especially as both Britain and the U.S. demanded detailed disclosure of the reform plans, with Britain even showing signs of leaking China's plans to Japan. By late October, the Ministry of Finance had abandoned hopes for British aid and was prepared to proceed with the reform without external assistance. The urgency of the domestic economic crisis, compounded by Japanese aggression and the need to maintain governance, made the currency reform imperative.

=== Unifying Chinese currency ===
On 3 November 1935, the Nationalist government moved to mandate the use of the CNC from 4 November onwards. Only three banks, named the Central Bank, the Bank of China, and the Bank of Communications, were authorised to issue this currency. All public and private payments, including taxes, were to be made exclusively in CNC, and other bank-issued currencies were gradually phased out. The decree declared silver as state property, prohibiting private silver transactions, with violators facing confiscation of their silver holdings. Individuals were required to exchange their silver holdings for fabi within a set period, and all previous silver-based contracts were to be settled in CNC. To ensure currency stability, a Reserve Committee was established to manage and uphold the creditworthiness of the CNC, allowing the issuing banks to freely buy and sell foreign exchange to stabilise the currency's value. In his supporting statement, Finance Minister H.H. Kung affirmed that the Central Bank would focus solely on its central banking functions, acting as the "Central Reserve Bank" by holding the reserve funds of other banks and managing the national treasury, ceasing regular banking activities. The government pledged to avoid inflation and maintain fiscal balance. To allay public concerns, the Ministry of Finance stated that the centralised reserves would prevent bank runs, strengthen currency issuance, enhance the financial sector's resilience, and ensure that the fabi remained backed by silver, thus safeguarding against inflation.

== Aftermath ==
On 2 November 1935, a day before the currency reform, the Nationalist government unexpectedly informed foreign diplomats of its impending reform. The British representative, Sir Frederick Leith-Ross, told American officials that he was not directing China's reforms but acknowledged that the Chinese plan was generally sound. U.S. Treasury Secretary Henry Morgenthau Jr. realised that China had taken the initiative, making it inevitable for China and the U.S. to reach an agreement for foreign exchange. While he was keen to support China, Morgenthau also desired that the new currency be linked to the U.S. dollar.

The sudden announcement of the CNC reform on 3 November displeased Japanese merchants, government, and military. On the night of 3 November, a meeting of Japanese banks in Shanghai decided not to support the reform. They agreed to conduct transactions in CNC but refused to turn over their silver holdings. Their stance later softened, leading to the submission of silver reserves in Shanghai, but they refused to remit silver from northern China and demanded that the Chinese government not transfer confiscated silver southward. On 6 November, Japan's Ministry of Foreign Affairs issued a protest to Chinese diplomats, arguing that China had secured British backing for the reform, aligning with the U.K. and the U.S. at the expense of Japanese interests and Sino-Japanese relations. Japan threatened stronger actions in North China, but the Chinese government firmly rejected these complaints. On 9 November, Japan's military released a strongly worded statement condemning China's nationalisation of silver. It argued that the Nationalist government lacked the trust of its people, predicting that the CNC would soon be worthless, and claimed that the reform undermined peace in East Asia and was a self-destructive move. During the subsequent Sino-Japanese War, Japan engaged in large-scale counterfeiting of CNC, purchasing supplies, exerting pressure on the currency in the foreign exchange market to devalue it, and banning the use of CNC in occupied territories. Due to the hostility with Japan, the U.S. ultimately agreed to China's request for assistance, which included selling a substantial amount of American silver in exchange for foreign currency.
