= Chinese gold yuan =

Currency of China, August 1948 – 1949

Gold Yuan (English); 金圓券 (Chinese)
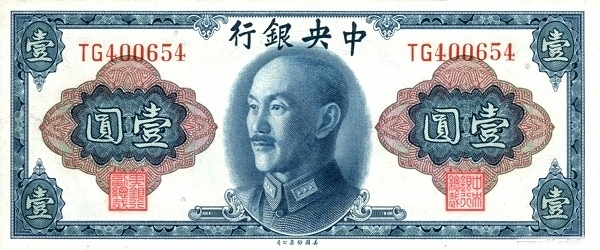
- 1 gold yuan bill, 1948

Units of account
- Symbol: ¥
- Subunit
- 1/100: cent

Denominations
- Banknotes
- Freq. used: ¥500, ¥1,000, ¥10,000, ¥50,000, ¥100,000, ¥500,000
- Rarely used: 10 cents, 20 cents, 50 cents, ¥10, ¥20, ¥50, ¥100, ¥5,000,000

Demographics
- Date of introduction: 19 August 1948
- Replaced: Chinese customs gold unit; Chinese National Currency
- Date of withdrawal: 3 July 1949
- Replaced by: Mainland: Renminbi; Taiwan: Silver yuan and New Taiwan dollar
- Official user(s): China
- Unofficial users: Tibet; Second East Turkestan Republic

Issuance
- Central bank: Central Bank of the Republic of China

Valuation
- Inflation: 1,566,101.60% per year
- This infobox shows the latest status before this currency was rendered obsolete.

The Chinese gold yuan (also known as golden round, golden yuan, among others) was a legal tender currency of China between August 1948 and 1949. It was a method used by the Republic of China government to accumulate gold from its citizens to fund its war effort. It circulated in the country under the effective control of the Government of the Republic of China, which issued paper money on August 19, 1948. This currency was notorious for vicious inflation due to inadequate issuance preparation and failure to strictly enforce issuance limits. In the early days of the issuance of the golden yuan, the government used executive actions to force the public to exchange gold and foreign currency for the new currency. The legal exchange rate was 0.22217 grams of gold per gold yuan but it could not be honored. The sharply depreciating fabi currency was at the rate of one golden yuan to 3 million fabi yuan, and this rate was used for the compulsory collection of public gold, silver, and foreign currency. In particular, the economic losses suffered by the urban middle class were so great that the ROC government lost its original most important supporters and was one of the reasons why the ROC government failed so quickly in the Chinese Civil War.

After the failure of the issuance of the Golden Yuan, the government of the Republic of China immediately issued the silver yuan, but it was soon rejected in circulation, and the Chinese golden yuan was recalled by Central People's Government with the RMB; the People's Government announced from June 1949 to stop the circulation of the golden yuan, and its replacement for the modern-day yuan at a rate of 100,000 yuan to 1 yuan.

== Background ==
The purpose of the issuance of a new currency was to replace the original hyperinflated Fabi currency that was issued by the Nationalist government since 1935. During the Second Sino-Japanese War, Fabi currency was issued in large quantities due to increased fiscal expenditure. After the war, the number of Fabi currency issued by the National Government to pay for the huge military costs of the war against the Communists increased rapidly from 556.9 billion yuan at the time of the victory of the war to 604 trillion yuan in August 1948, an increase of over a thousand times in less than three years.

In terms of the size of the currency supply, it consisted of 1.4 billion yuan before the war. In early 1947, Fabi currency issues totaled 3.5 trillion yuan, rising to over 10 trillion yuan by July. With no real increase in government inventories gold, foreign currency, such huge issuances led to the extreme inflation. In the beginning, some paper mills were profiting from the use of low-denomination Fabi currency resource recovery as raw material for paper making. T.V. Soong, when he was in Executive charge of the Yuan, tried to stabilize the Fabi currency with a financial policy of selling inventory gold to buy back the Fabi currency. But it was fruitless because the Fabi currency kept being issued massively, so it couldn't be fully backed by gold.

After the constitutional election in May 1948, Weng Wenhao became Executive Yuan Head and Wang Yun-wu was appointed Minister of Finance and began planning for monetary reform. At the same time, Chiang arranged for Yu Hung-chun, former Minister of Finance and former president of the Central Bank, to also draw up a proposal for currency reform. The drafting team, led by central bank experts organized by Yu, believed that the Fabi currency could be maintained for some time without fundamental reform, and would collapse faster if fundamental reform was carried out.

The program elaborated by Yu's team focused mainly on the increase and improvement of fiscal revenues, proposing to use this special currency for all tax payments and foreign trade remittances without depreciating along with the Fabi currency, following the example of the 1937 tariffs levied by customs, which would increase the proportion of fiscal revenues to fiscal expenditures from more than 10 to 40 or 50 percent. The government's efforts to improve the economy and the economy of the country were not satisfactory, but Chiang was not satisfied with this and thought that it could not collect the country's gold, silver, and private foreign exchange reserves to cope with the difficult situation. At the meeting, Executive Yuan President Weng Wenhao, Foreign Minister Wang Shijie and Central Bank President Yu Hung-chun agreed.

In addition to the attendees, Chiang only approached Chang Kia-ngau, the former general manager of Bank of China, who had just resigned as president of the Central Bank, and Weng Wenhao, who informed U.S. Ambassador to China John Leighton Stuart a few days before the reform was to take place.

== Later Issue ==
On August 19, 1948, the Chinese Kuomintang convened a Central Political Conference to approve the currency reform proposal put forward by Weng Wenho, Wang Yunwu. Weng Wen-hao held a meeting of the Executive Council that afternoon to discuss and approve the currency reform proposal. According to the Temporary Provisions against the Communist Rebellion adopted by the First Session of the First National Assembly, Chiang issued a "Financial and Economic Emergency Disposition Order" on August 19, issuing Golden Yuan Bills while stopping the issuance of Fabi; and placing economic control supervisors. Chiang made a speech calling on his compatriots to follow the decree and embrace the new currency system for the benefit of the nation. It also announced the "Golden Yuan Issuance Law", the main contents of which are.

The Chinese gold yuan issue is fully provisioned, its composition must be composed of assets of which 40% must be gold, silver and foreign exchange currency, with the remainder being filled with marketable securities and government-designated state-owned business assets. 0.22217-{cm}-(-{cm}-i.e. grams) per dollar of statutory gold bearing, issued by Central Bank, with the aggregate issue set at $2 billion. The Chinese gold yuan coupons shall be converted into Fabi three million dollars, Northeast circulation coupons three hundred thousand dollars, and shall expire on or before December 20, 1948, when the issued Fabi currency and Northeast circulation coupons shall be redeemed, and the Fabi currency and Northeast circulation coupons shall be circulated and exercised according to the above conversion rates, and the treatment of the Taiwan provincial and Xinjiang coins shall be determined by the Executive Yuan separately. The public and private debts in Fabi currency and North-East Notes were settled in accordance with the above exchange rates.

1. Private possession of gold (200 rounds of pure gold 1-city two-alloy rounds), silver (3 rounds of pure silver 1-city two-alloy rounds), silver coins (2 rounds per aligned round), foreign exchange (4 rounds per dollar aligned round) is prohibited. For private holders, the redeemable vouchers can be confiscated by September 30. Accordingly, the People's Rules for the Treatment of Gold, Silver and Foreign Currency were formulated, promulgated and implemented.
  Registration for a limited period of time of foreign exchange assets deposited abroad by the people of the country (including legal persons), with sanctions for non-compliance.
2. National prices and labor prices are frozen at August 19 levels.

At the same time, Chiang sent economic supervisors to the major cities to oversee the issuance of golden yuan. Among them, Shanghai, as the nation's financial hub, was Chiang Ching-kuo as deputy supervisor (took office on August 23, and left on November 6), and the current supervisor was Central Bank President Yu Hongjun, who had actual control over Shanghai's economic situation.

On November 16, 1948, the president of the Central Bank, Yu Hongjun, reported to Chiang Kai-shek the results of the redemption of 1,663,000 taels of gold, 8,937,000 yuan of silver (i.e. silver ingots), 2,438,000 yuan of silver, 4,775,000 yuan of U.S. banknotes, and 8,735,000 yuan of Hong Kong dollars, making a total of US$190 million.

According to the Measures for the Administration of Foreign Exchange Registration of the People of the Republic of China, foreign exchange assets of the people (including natural persons, legal persons, and other associations) deposited abroad shall be declared and registered with the Central Bank or other designated banks before 1 December. The Shanghai Banking Association agreed to raise the full $10 million in accordance with the strengths of each. On 6 September 1948, at the Prime Minister's Memorial Week held at the Central Party Department of the Kuomintang, Chiang Chung-cheng rebuked these leading figures of commercial banks in Shanghai for not complying with the decree to register all their foreign exchange assets (estimated at US$300 million) with the Central Bank, and for wanting to raise US$10 million as a perfunctory measure, and still, as in the past 20 or 30 years, they only loved money, knew only themselves, did not know the people's livelihood, flouted the decree and disregarded the righteousness of the people. According to a report published in the Grand Gazette on 16 August 1948, comparing the pre-war living index, food prices rose 3.9 million times in the first half of August, housing prices rose 770,000 times, clothing prices rose 6.52 million times, and the newspaper that day circled a text message in the form of a lacy news item: "Big pie doughnuts, 100,000 yuan each."

At the same time, the government of the Republic of China tried to freeze prices by decree, forcing merchants to supply goods at pre-August 19 prices and prohibiting price hikes or hoarding. And the capitalists were forced, though unwillingly, to convert some of their assets into gold notes under pressure from the government. In Shanghai, Chiang Ching-kuo imprisoned some capitalists who did not follow political orders and shot them to death as a warning to others. And Du Yueh-Sheng's son Du Weiping was also imprisoned for hoarding. Chiang Ching-kuo's severe "tiger hunting" in Shanghai had slightly gained the people's confidence in the Golden Round.

== Collapse ==
The Golden yuan had no cash provision and no restrictions on issuance, resulting in a total failure. The failure of the Golden yuan was doomed in the first place. Since the total amount of Fabi currency issued at the time of its withdrawal from circulation was 663 trillion yuan, the total amount of Fabi currency issued was only 200 million yuan in gold notes with 3 million yuan of Fabi currency combined with 1 yuan of gold notes. The gold notes were set to be issued at the beginning of 2 billion yuan, which is equivalent to creating an inflation equivalent to 10 times the final Fabi currency at once.

The gold yuan failed with even greater speed than the fabi had.

The currency collapse began prior to the Nationalists' military defeat. In April and May 1949, Nanjing and Shanghai were successively overrun by the Chinese People's Liberation Army, and the Communist Party announced the cessation of the circulation of gold vouchers from June. The R.O.C. government continued to issue Golden Yuan notes after moving to Guangzhou, and Xinjiang and other regions continued to issue them, but their value was close to that of waste paper, for example, Xinjiang banks issued single high-denomination notes of $6 billion.

== Denominations ==
In 1946, the Republic of China government experimentally commissioned the British Thomas de Narro Banknote Printing Company to print 10 cents (10 cents) and 20 cents (20 cents) in two small denominations, and in August 1948, five types of banknotes - 50 cents, 10 cents, 20 cents, 50 cents and 100 cents - were issued. The ROC Central Printing Office printed 50-cent and 10-yuan notes, while the Central Printing Office and China Book Office were ordered to issue two plates of each denomination, and the ROC government commissioned the British Walt's Road Company to print several gold circulars, but they were issued in very small numbers and circulated only in Shanghai; In January 1949, 100-yuan Central Printing Office red plate notes and 500-yuan notes were issued, and in February the production and issuance of 1,000-yuan notes began gradually; in March 1949, 5,000-yuan notes were issued, followed by 10,000-yuan notes; in April, 50,000-yuan notes and 100,000-yuan notes; in May, 500,000-dollar notes and 1 million-dollar notes were issued, but Shanghai was immediately occupied by the PLA and the 5 million-yuan note was issued with limited circulation, before the People’s Bank Of China traded and destroyed these notes.

== Impact ==
The rapid devaluation of the Gold yuan and the resulting hyperinflation stem from the government's fiscal and monetary policies. The Republic of China's government continued to maintain the war despite the financial constraints. The government deficit is paid for by printing money, causing sharp inflation. The government, unable to control the issuance of a common currency on its own, merely tries to maintain prices and currency values by executive orders that violate the laws of the market, eventually causing financial chaos and market collapse.

The people most affected by the Gold yuan crisis were the lower middle class in the city. They had no greater capital and resources to protect what little they had, nor were they as unproductive as the rural peasants or proletariat. In the early days of the issuance of the Gold yuan, or when forced, or out of trust in the government, to exchange the accumulated property for the Gold yuan, the greatest losses were suffered in the hyperinflation, and some people became destitute as a result. The Republic of China's government, despite the hundreds of millions of dollars of gold and silver foreign exchange seized from the people through the issuance of the Gold Yuan notes, lost the trust and support of the most inclined class in the country: the urban people.

In 1948, the Nationalist Government had already suffered a series of military defeats, and the Gold Yuan storm had deprived the ROC government of all its remaining popular support and morale. Currency abuse was one of the reasons for the rapid collapse of the entire national government regime on the continent.

== The Golden Yuan and Taiwan ==
At that time, the Taiwan Provincial Government was ordered to transfer Taiwan Sugar's total assets of 120 million U.S. dollars to the custodianship method under the Golden Yuan issue, and Taiwan Paper's total assets of 25 million U.S. dollars to 8 million U.S. dollars, thus further drawing Taiwan into the deteriorating economic situation of Mainland China. And at that time, the exchange of the Golden Yuan for Taiwan Dollar $1,835 was also significantly overestimated, and the inflow of mainland China into Taiwan hedging brought Taiwan under severe vicious inflationary pressure and worsened the economic situation In June 1949, Taiwan reformed its monetary system and issued New Taiwan Dollar.

== See also ==
- Hyperinflation
- Inflation
- History of Chinese currency
