= Executive Order 6814 =

1934 United States executive order

On August 9, 1934, U.S. President Franklin D. Roosevelt implemented the seizure of all silver situated in the continental United States with Executive Order 6814 - Requiring the Delivery of All Silver to the United States for Coinage.

Executive Order 6814 closely mirrors Executive Order 6102, which FDR signed on April 5, 1933, "forbidding the Hoarding of Gold Coin, Gold Bullion, and Gold Certificates within the continental United States" with some differences. A key difference was that EO 6102 excluded the seizure of all silver coins, whether foreign or domestic, while EO 6814 only exempted from seizure certain types of collectible or numismatic coins.

== See also ==
- Executive Order 6102 - Requiring Gold Coin, Gold Bullion and Gold Certificates to Be Delivered to the Government
- Executive Order 6260 - On Hoarding and Exporting Gold
- Gold Standard Repeal 1933
- Silver Purchase Act of 1934
- Gold Reserve Act of 1934
- Silver Coinage Act of 1939
- Silver Purchase Act of 1946
- Silver Purchase Repeal Act of 1963
- Coinage Act of 1965
- Silver Certificate Act of 1967
- Coinage Act of 1978
