= Chinese National Currency =

Chinese currency during 1935–1948

法幣 (Chinese) CNC$
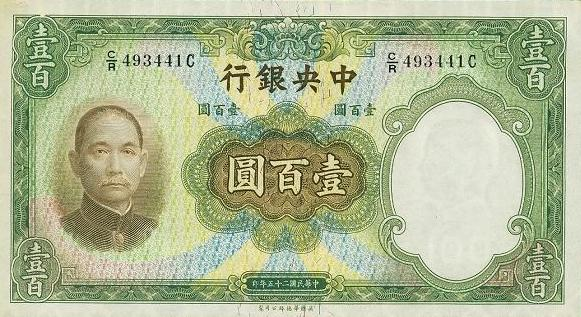
- 100-yuan banknote

Units of account
- Subunit
- 1/10: 角 (jiao)
- 1/100: 分 (fen)

Demographics
- Date of introduction: 1935
- Date of withdrawal: 19 August 1948
- Replaced by: Chinese gold yuan
- User(s): China
- This infobox shows the latest status before this currency was rendered obsolete.

The Chinese National Currency (CNC), often transliterated as fapi or fabi (Note: traditional Chinese: 法幣; simplified Chinese: 法币; lit. 'Fiat money') or translated as Legal Tender Note, was the currency of China between 1935 and 1948. Introduced in the 1935 currency reform, the currency was initially issued by the Central Bank, the Bank of China, the Bank of Communications and later the Farmer's Bank of China. In June 1942, it became solely issued by the Central Bank. It was replaced by the Gold Yuan in August 1948.

== See also ==
- Central Bank of China
- Chinese hyperinflation
