= Luna Plaza =

Shopping mall in Yilan City, Yilan County, Taiwan

- 蘭城新月廣場

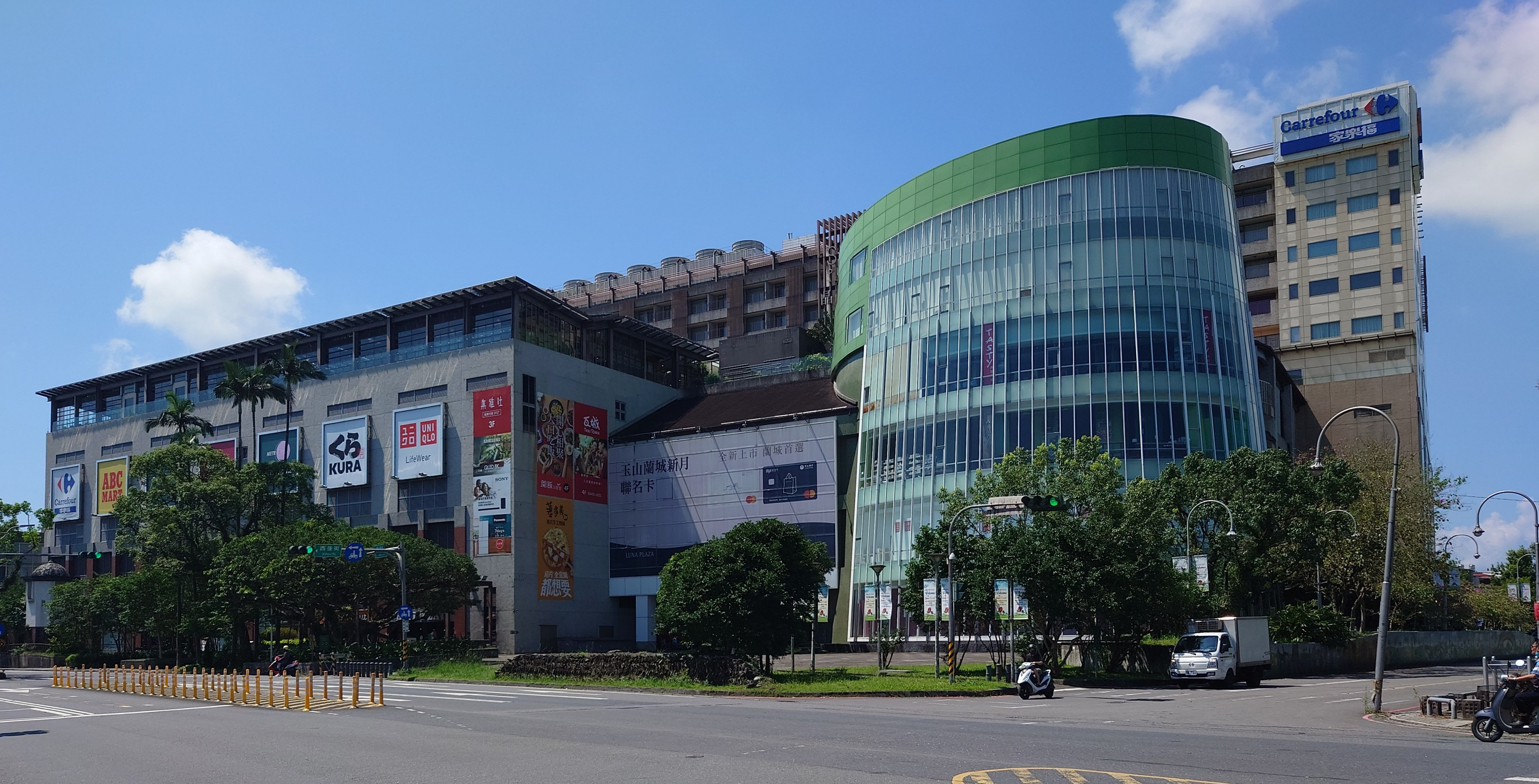
- Location: No. 6, Lane 38, Section 2, Minquan Road, Yilan City, Yilan County, Taiwan
- Coordinates: 24.754260499958555°N 121.7509486128956°E
- Opened: 2008
- Manager: WONDERFUL ASSETS CO., LTD.
- Floor area: 130,000 m^{2} (1,400,000 sq ft)
- Floors: 11 floors above ground 4 floors below ground
- Parking: 1246
- Website: www.lunaplaza.com.tw

Luna Plaza (Chinese: 蘭城新月廣場; pinyin: Lán chéng xīn yuè guǎngchǎng) is a shopping center in Yilan City, Yilan County, Taiwan that opened in 2008. It is the largest shopping mall in the county as well as in eastern Taiwan.

== Facilities ==
Luna Plaza is located in the commercial area of Southern Gate as defined by the urban planning measures of Yilan City. The commercial area emerged after the city rezoning process of the Former Yilan Prison by Yilan County Government. It is part of the South Gate Project and is part of the county government's overall old city regeneration cultural corridor (starting from Yilan railway station, extending from the Old City East Road and the Old City South Road to the Yilan River, forming a crescent-shaped corridor).

Luna Plaza was originally Carrefour’s first base in Yilan and was equipped with a community-based shopping mall. Later, it was transformed into a composite commercial building with various commercial facilities such as outlet stores, a five-star hotel, mass merchandisers, and cinemas, so that different consumers can meet their needs for sightseeing and local shopping at once. The 6th to 11th floors of the building house Silks Place Yilan（蘭城晶英酒店), a five-star hotel.

== See also ==
- List of tourist attractions in Taiwan
- Urban Shopping Plaza
