= Urban Shopping Plaza =

Shopping mall in Yilan City, Yilan County, Taiwan

- 爾本購物廣場
- Location: No. 159, Section 1, Yixing Road, Yilan City, Yilan County, Taiwan
- Coordinates: 24°45′21″N 121°45′25″E
- Opened: 13 July 2022
- Floor area: 10,000 m^{2} (110,000 sq ft)
- Floors: 2 floors above ground
- Parking: 450
- Public transit: Yilan railway station

Urban Shopping Plaza (Chinese: 爾本購物廣場) is a shopping mall located in Yilan City, Yilan County, Taiwan that opened on 13 July 2022. The mall was originally the staff dormitories of Taiwan Railways; after two years of design and reconstruction, the original building was demolished and rebuilt into a mall with a total floor area of around 10,000 m^{2} (110,000 sq ft) and 2 floors above ground, that provides 450 parking spaces. The plaza has introduced both domestic and international catering and lifestyle brands, including Sushiro, Nitori, Daiso, Starbucks, Kangol, and various themed restaurants.

== Public transportation ==
The mall is located in close proximity to Yilan railway station, which is served by the Taiwan Railway.

== See also ==
- List of tourist attractions in Taiwan
- Luna Plaza
