= Bank of Taiwan =

State-owned commercial bank in Taiwan

Bank of Taiwan 臺灣銀行

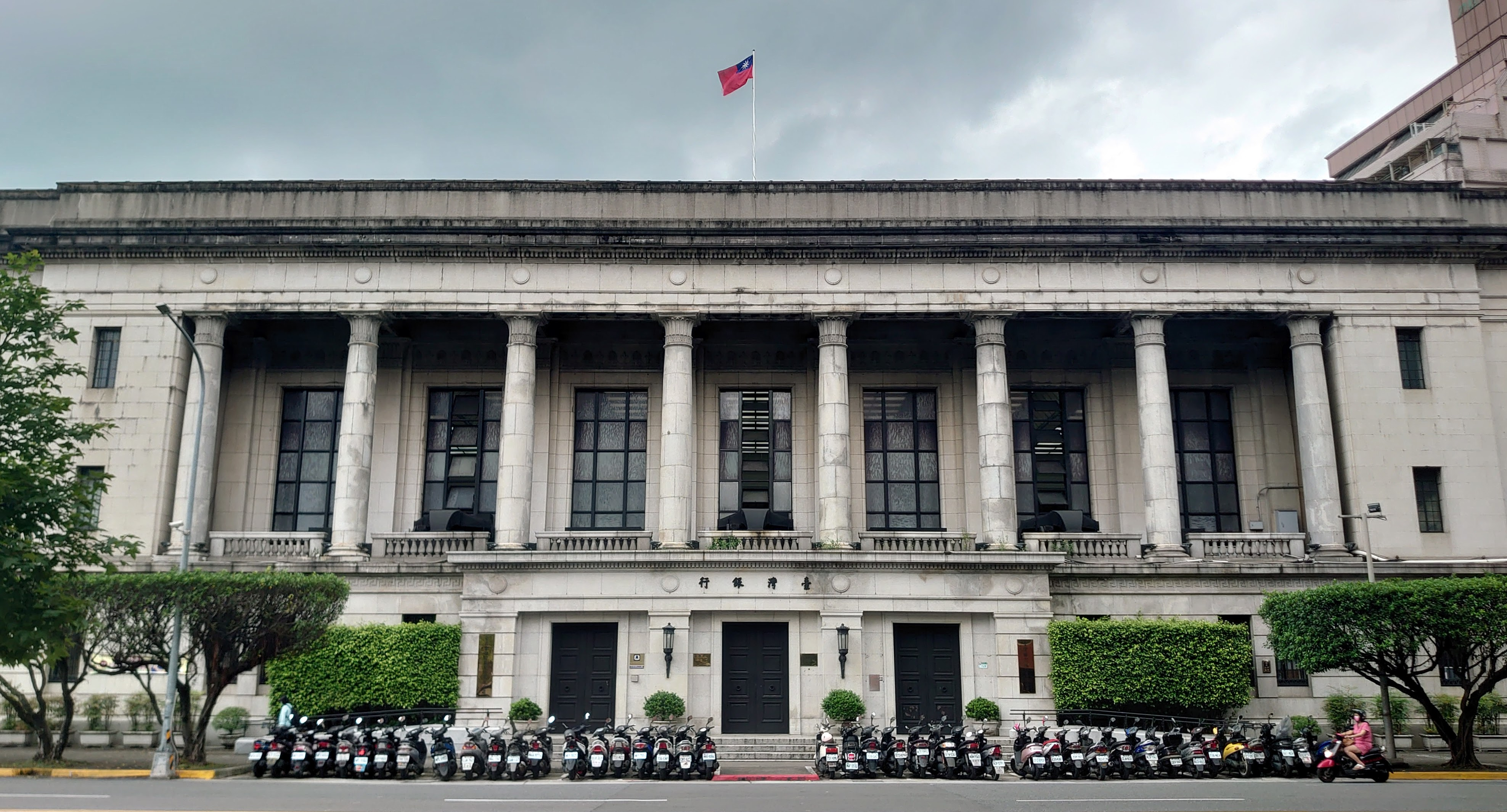
- Head office building in Taipei
- Type: State-owned
- Industry: Banking
- Founded: 1897; 129 years ago
- Headquarters: Taipei, Taiwan
- Area served: Taiwan; Japan; Australia; Singapore; United Kingdom; United States; China; Hong Kong; South Africa
- Key people: Jong-Yuan Ling (chairperson)
- Products: Financial services
- Total assets: ▲NTD 4,929 billion (2017) (US$ 1,643 billion)
- Number of employees: 8,122 (2017)
- Parent: Taiwan Financial Holdings Group
- Website: www.bot.com.tw/en/
- Footnotes; Issuer of banknotes (1899–2000), De facto Central Bank (1949–1961)

Bank of Taiwan

Chinese name
- Traditional Chinese: 臺灣銀行
- Simplified Chinese: 台湾银行
Transcriptions
Standard Mandarin
- Hanyu Pinyin: Táiwān Yínháng
- Bopomofo: ㄊㄞˊ ㄨㄢ ㄧㄣˊ ㄏㄤˊ
- Gwoyeu Romatzyh: Tair'uan Ynhang
- Wade–Giles: T'ai²-wan¹ In²-hang²
- Tongyong Pinyin: Táiwan Yínháng
- MPS2: Táiwān Yínháng
Hakka
- Romanization: Thòi-vàn ngiùn-hòng
Southern Min
- Hokkien POJ: Tâi-oân gîn-hâng
- Tâi-lô: Tâi-uân gîn-hâng

Japanese name
- Kanji: 臺灣銀行
- Kana: たいわんぎんこう
Transcriptions
- Romanization: Taiwan Ginkō

The Bank of Taiwan (BOT; Chinese: 臺灣銀行; pinyin: Táiwān Yínháng; Pe̍h-ōe-jī: Tâi-oân gîn-hâng) is a commercial bank headquartered in Taipei, Taiwan. It was established in 1897–1899 as a Japanese policy institution or "special bank", similarly as the Nippon Kangyo Bank (est. 1897), Hokkaido Takushoku Bank (est. 1900), Industrial Bank of Japan (est. 1902), and Bank of Chōsen (est. 1909). Its aim was to finance industrial demand in Japanese-ruled Taiwan and also to promote trade between South China, Southeast Asia and the Japanese possessions in the Pacific.

The Bank of Taiwan was the main issuer of banknotes on the island from 1899 to 1961, when that role was taken over by the Central Bank of China. Having lost its former role as a bank of issue, it remains owned by the Government of the Republic of China.

== History ==
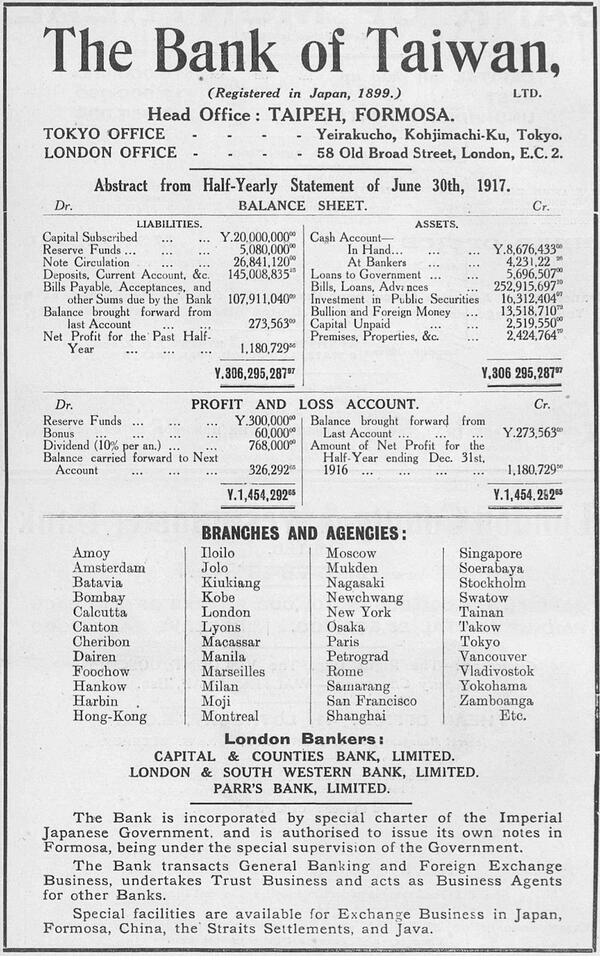
Bank of Taiwan advert in The Economist, 1917

=== Japanese colonial bank ===
The Bank of Taiwan's creation was authorized in 1897 by the Bank Act of Taiwan which also encouraged Japanese enterprises, such as the Mitsubishi and Mitsui Groups, to invest in Taiwan. It started operations in 1899.

A financial crisis in 1927 was relieved with assistance from the Bank of Japan. Bank branches were created in other parts of Asia as the Japanese empire expanded, including areas in China and Southeast Asia. By 1929, the Bank of Taiwan had a total 14 offices outside of Japan and its colonies, fewer than the Yokohama Specie Bank or Bank of Chōsen but more than any other Japanese commercial bank.

=== Bank of issue of the Republic of China ===
After the Japanese surrender in 1945, the ROC government (led by the Chinese Nationalist Party, or KMT) took over the Bank of Taiwan and began issuing Taiwan dollars, also known as Taiwan Nationalist Yuan, through the Bank of Taiwan. This currency is now referred to as the "old Taiwan dollar." Severe inflation of this currency during the Chinese Civil War led the Bank of Taiwan to issue the New Taiwan dollar in 1949. After the loss of mainland China in the Chinese Civil War by the KMT and its subsequent retreat to Taiwan, the Bank of Taiwan kept printing the island's banknotes until the Central Bank of China assumed that role in 1961.

=== Taiwanese commercial bank ===
The Bank of Taiwan was governed under the Taiwan Provincial Government until 1998 when governance was transferred to the ROC Finance Ministry. In 2001 the Central Bank of China took over the task of issuing the New Taiwan Dollar.

The Bank of Taiwan currently operates a total of 169 domestic branches as well as branches in Tokyo, Singapore, Hong Kong and the People's Republic of China. Branches have also been established in New York City, Los Angeles, London, and South Africa.

In July 2007, the Bank of Taiwan merged with the Central Trust (中央信託局) as part of a government financial reform package. The bank continues to operate as an independent company taking over some aspects of the Trust's banking business. In January 2008, the Bank became part of the Taiwan Financial Holdings Group (臺灣金融控股公司), which also contains BankTaiwan Securities and BankTaiwan Life Insurance.

== Gallery ==
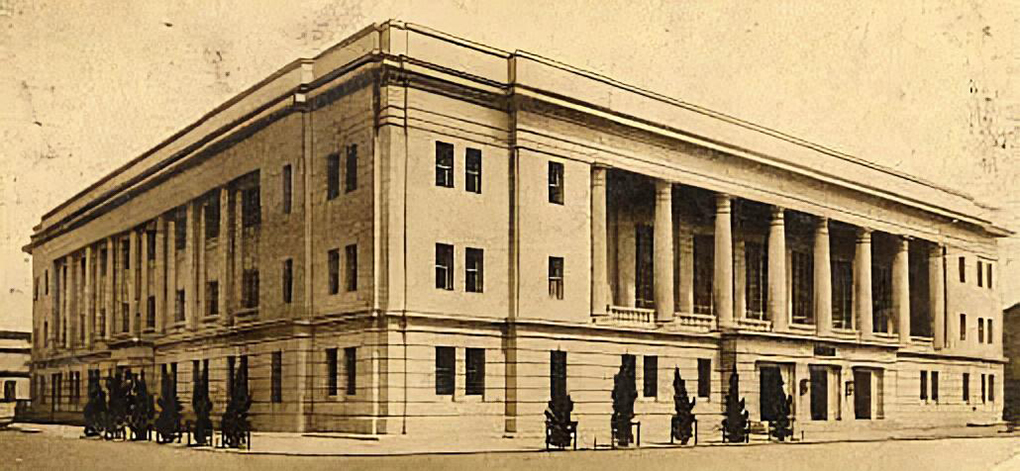
The Bank of Taiwan's head office in 1939

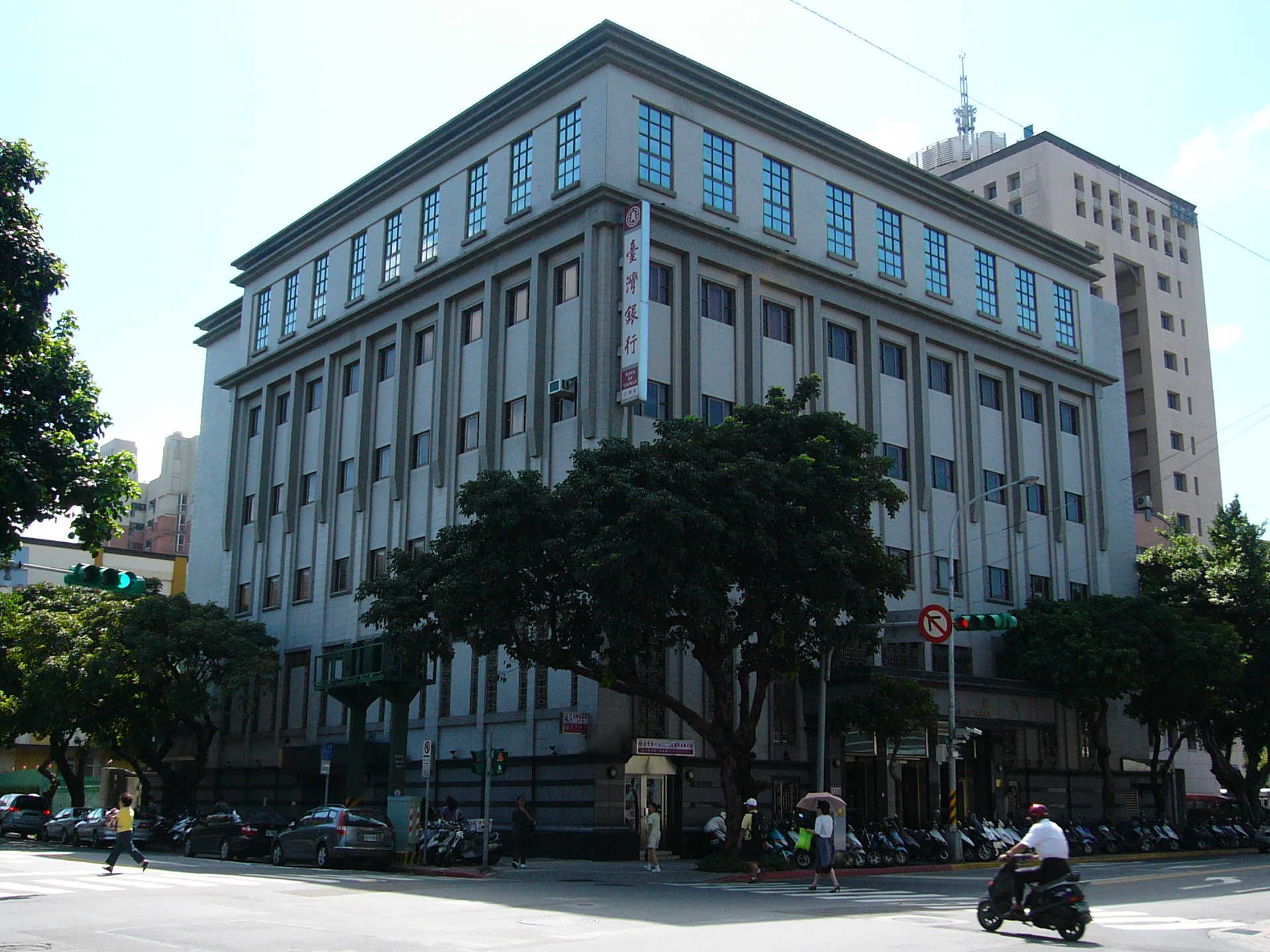
Bank of Taiwan Department of Public Treasury, Taipei

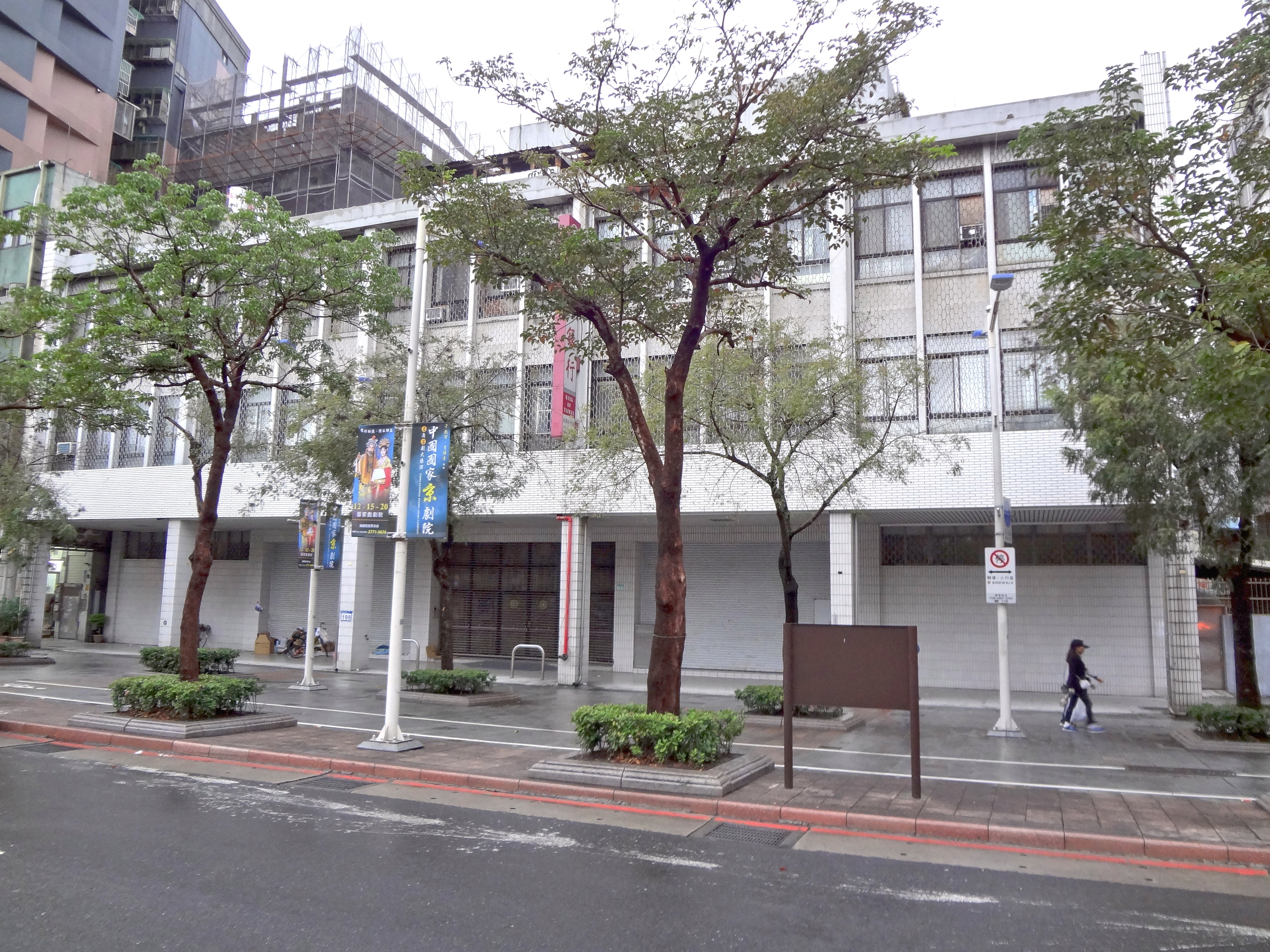
Bank of Taiwan Department of Economic Research, Taipei

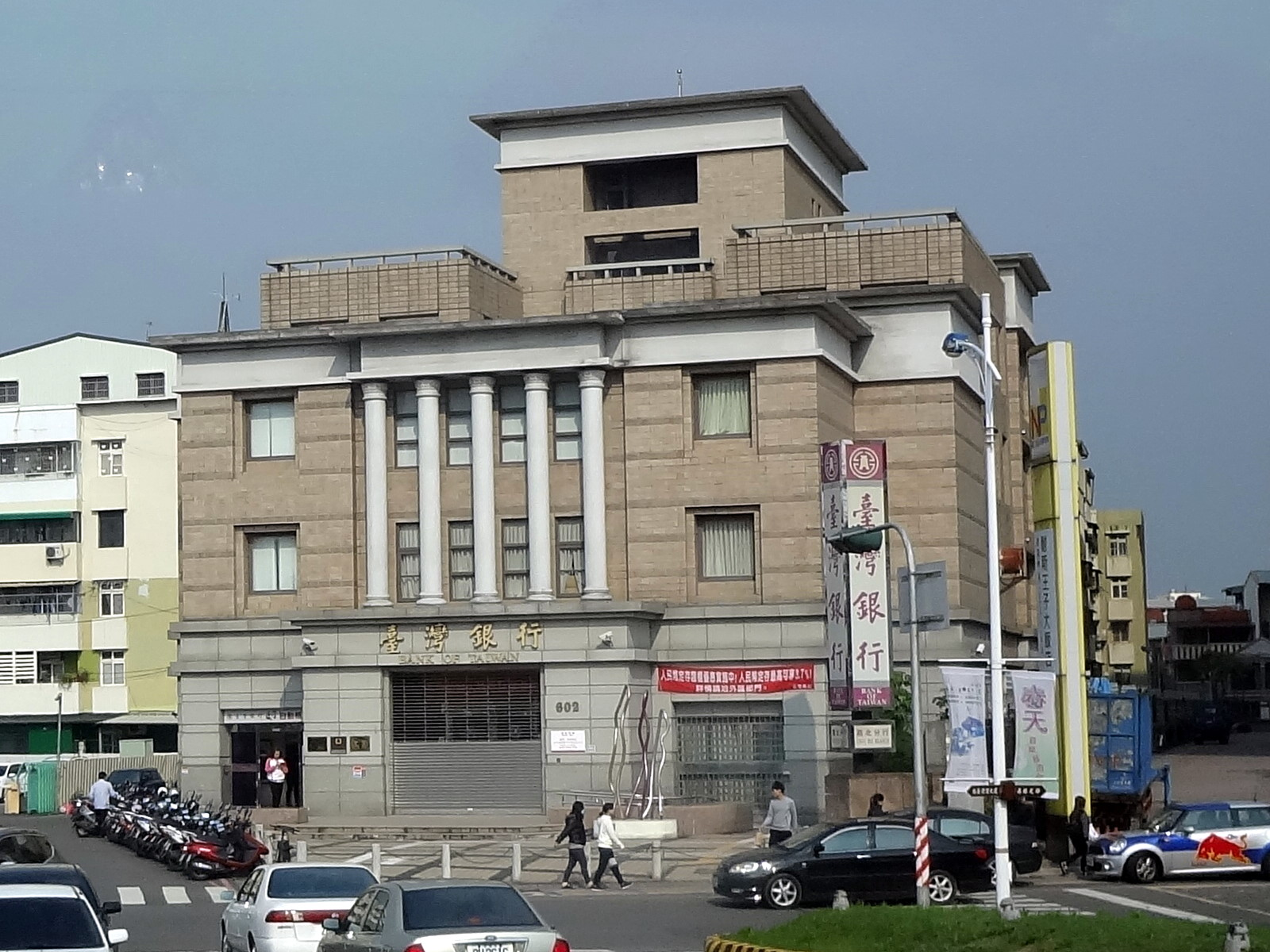
Branch in Chiayi, Taiwan

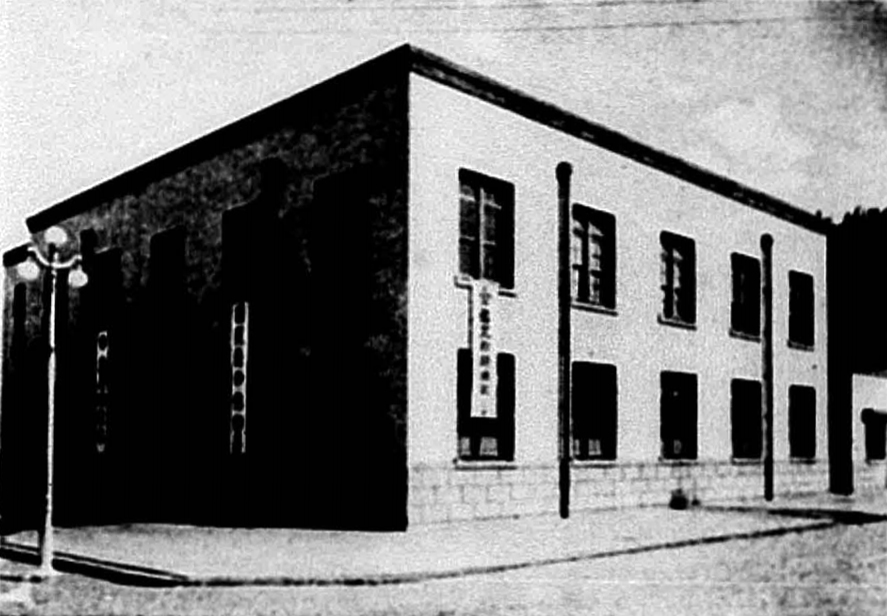
Branch in Hsinchu, Taiwan, photographed in 1939

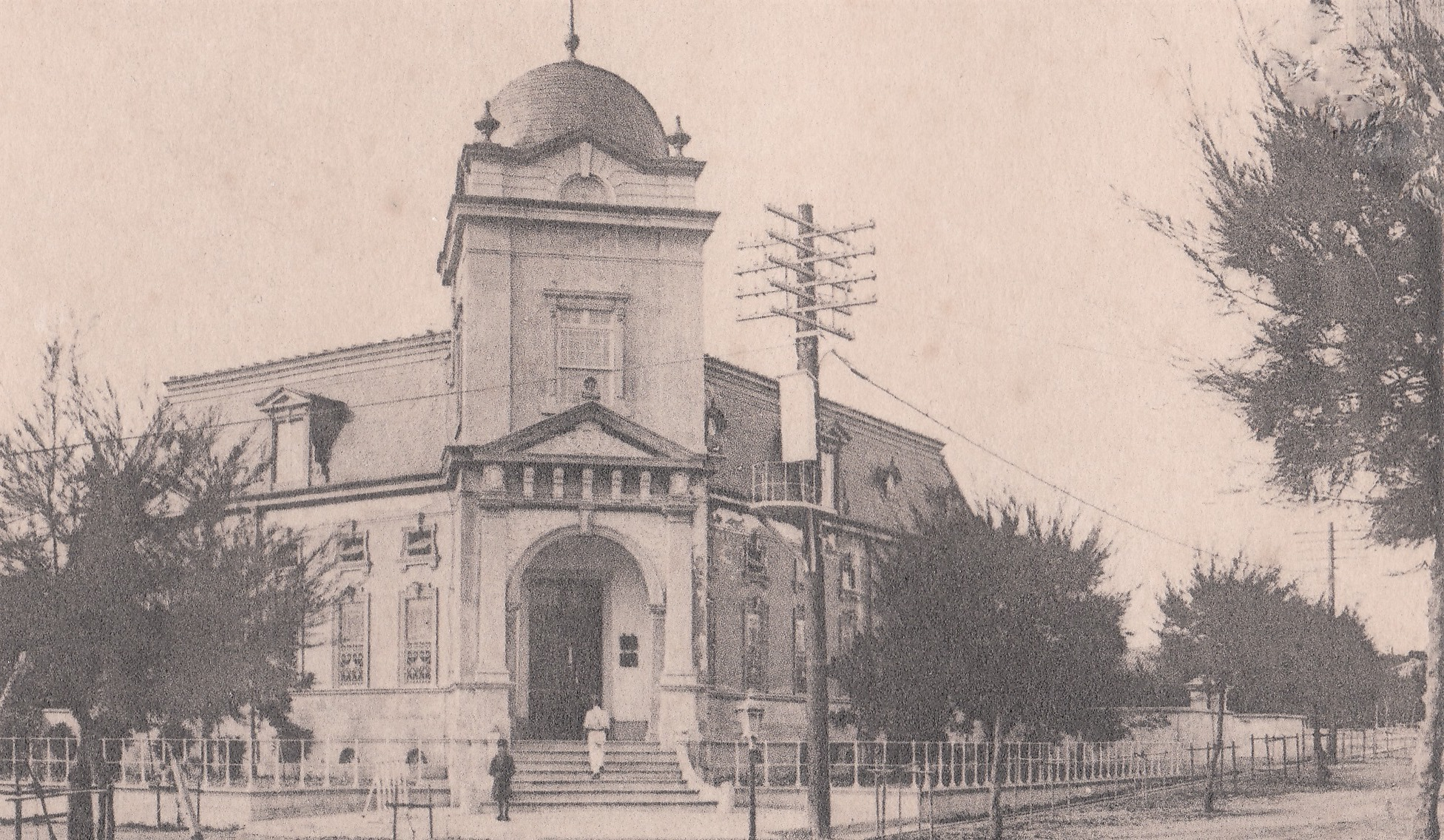
Branch in Hualien, Taiwan, photographed in 1916

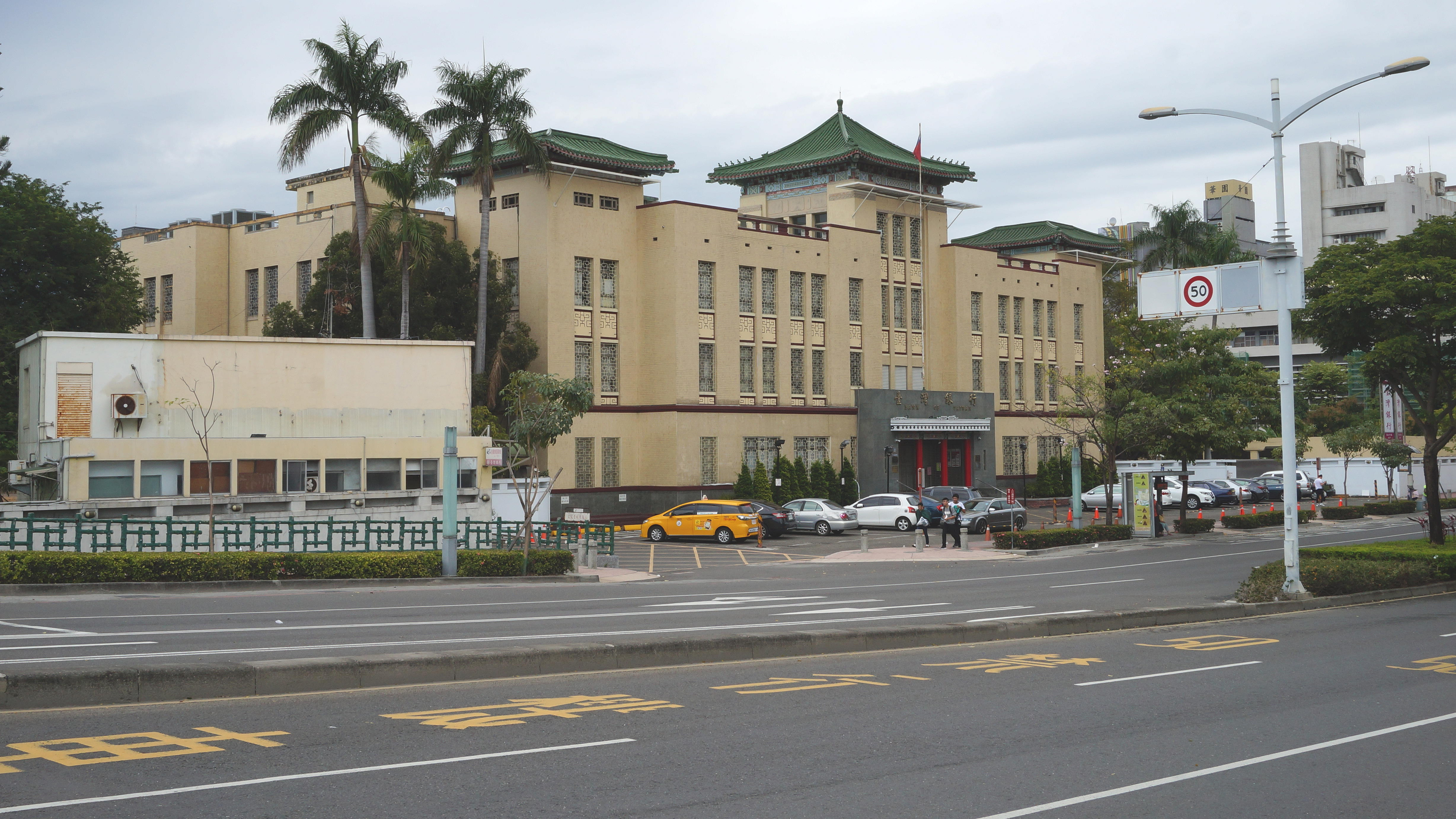
Branch in Kaohsiung, Taiwan

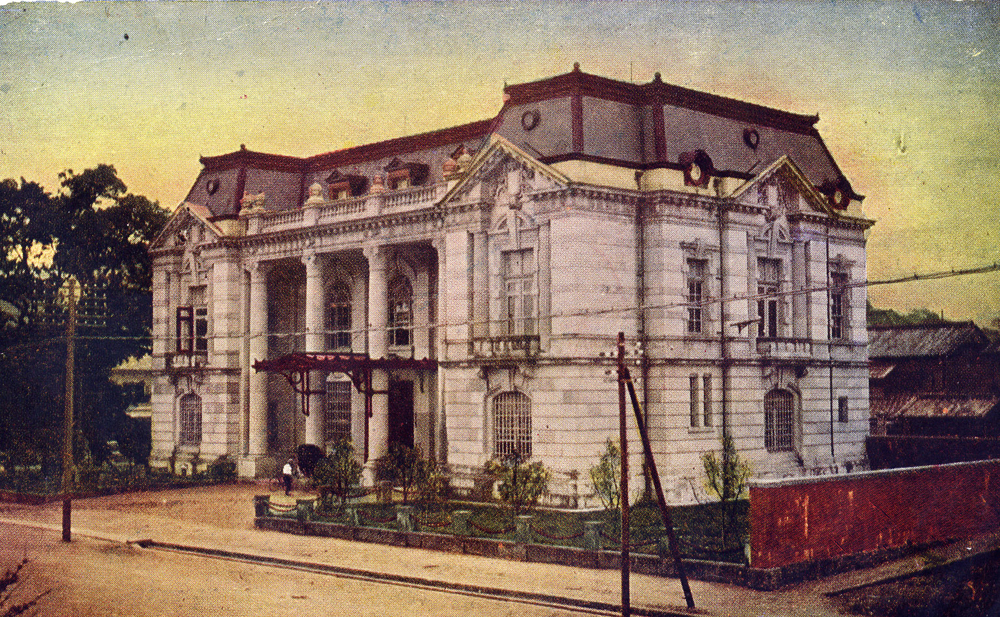
Branch in Keelung, Taiwan, photographed in 1919

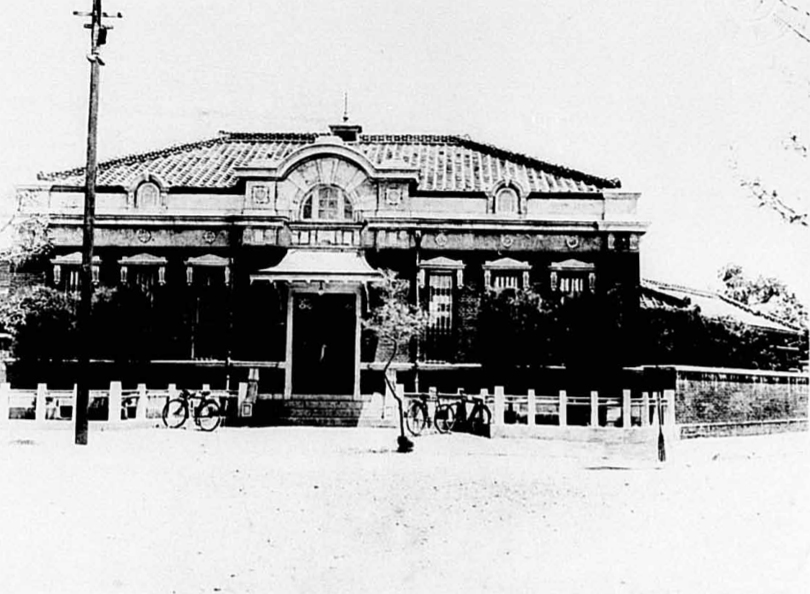
Branch in Pingtung, Taiwan, photographed in 1919

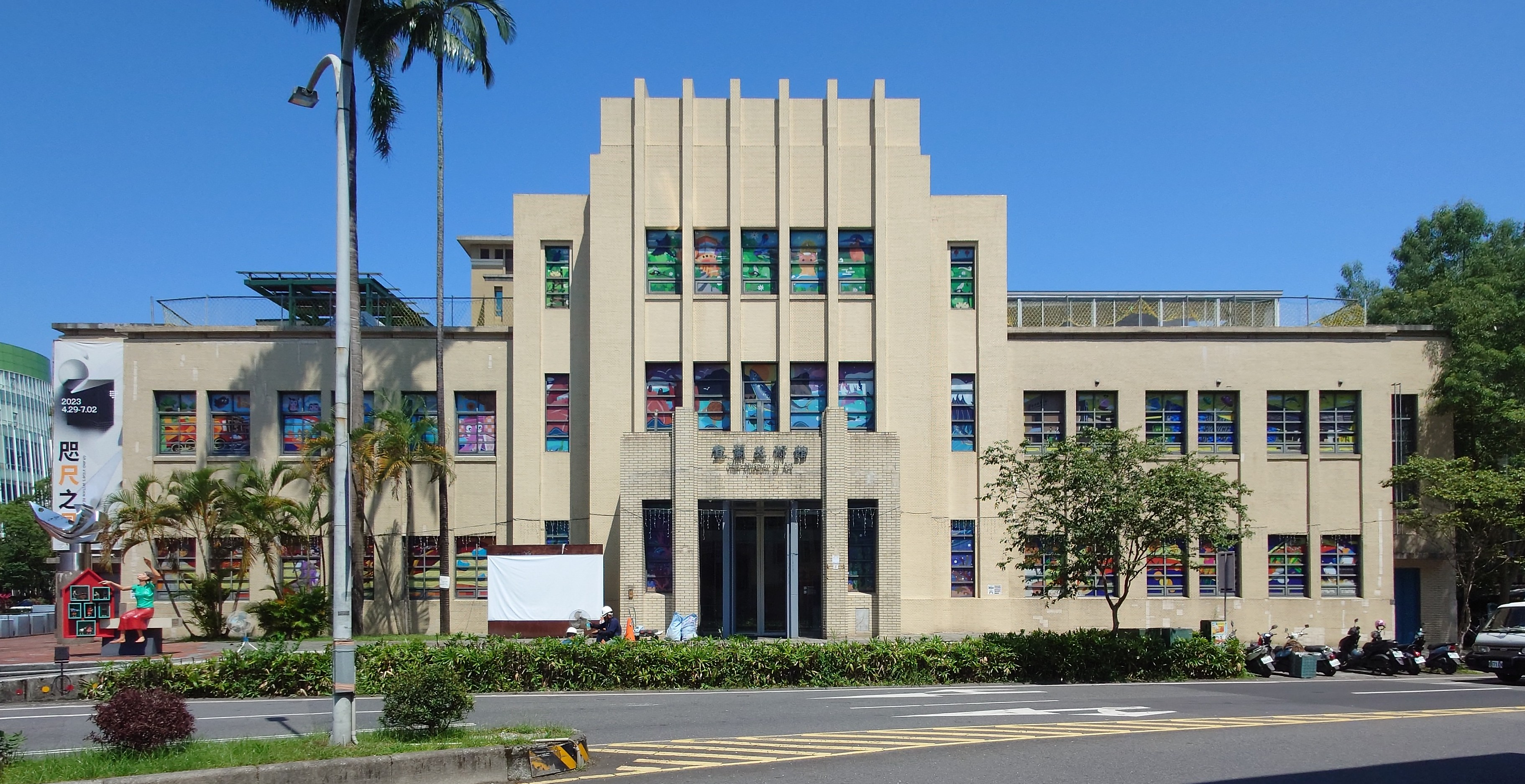
Former branch in Yilan, Taiwan, lately the Yilan Museum of Art

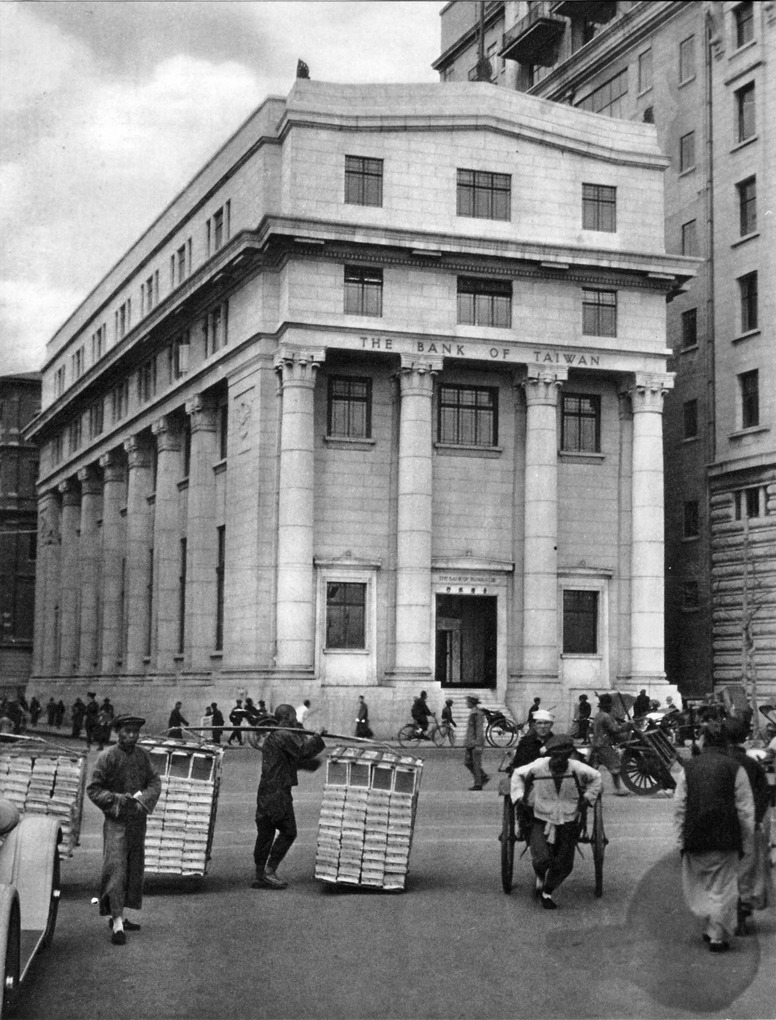
Bank of Taiwan Building in Shanghai, before 1949

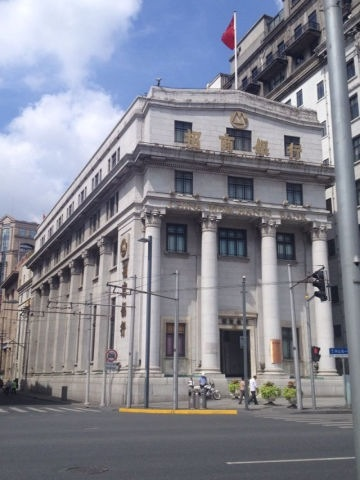
The same building in 2013, by then a branch of China Merchants Bank

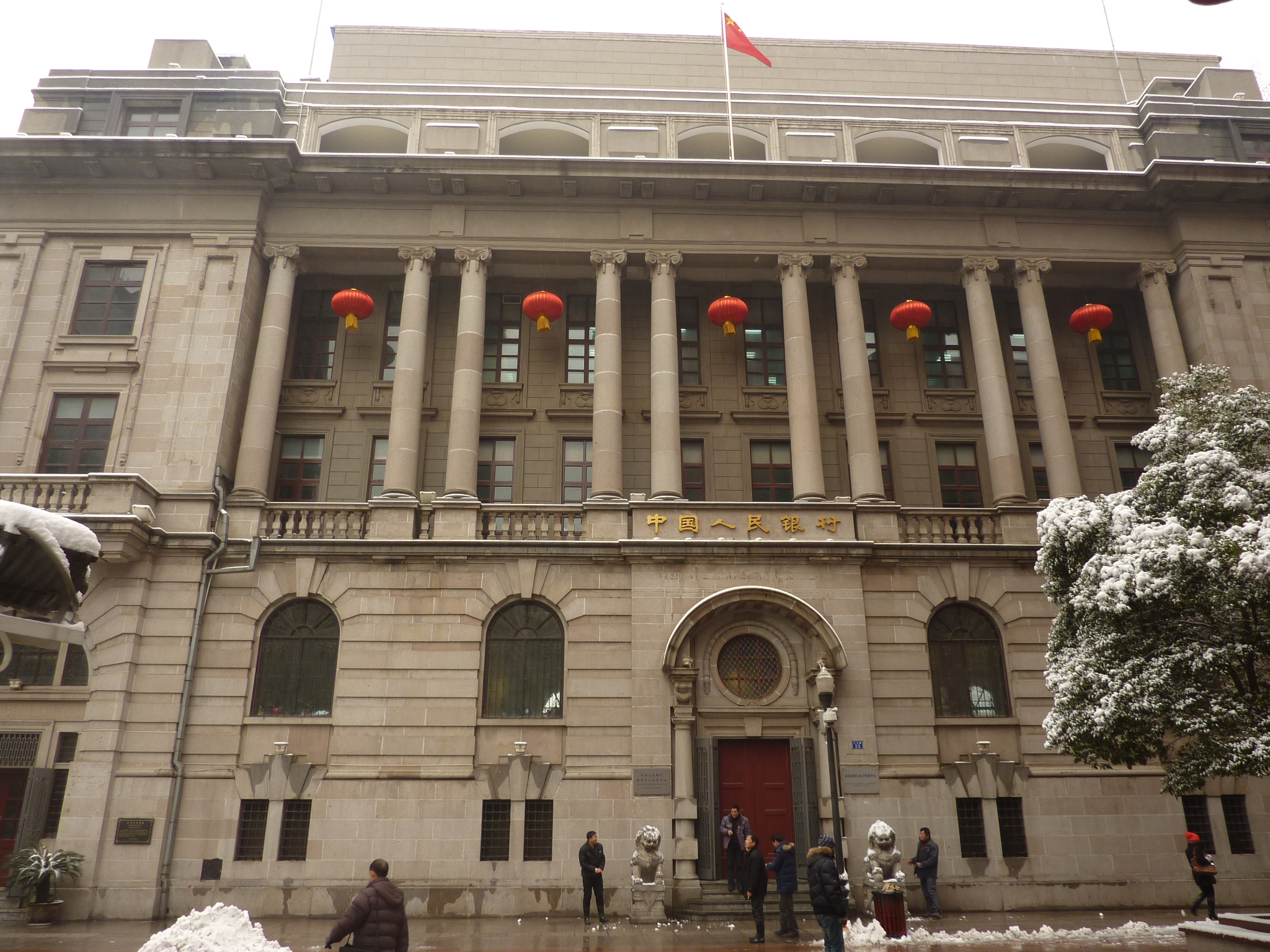
Former branch in Hankou, lately used by the People's Bank of China

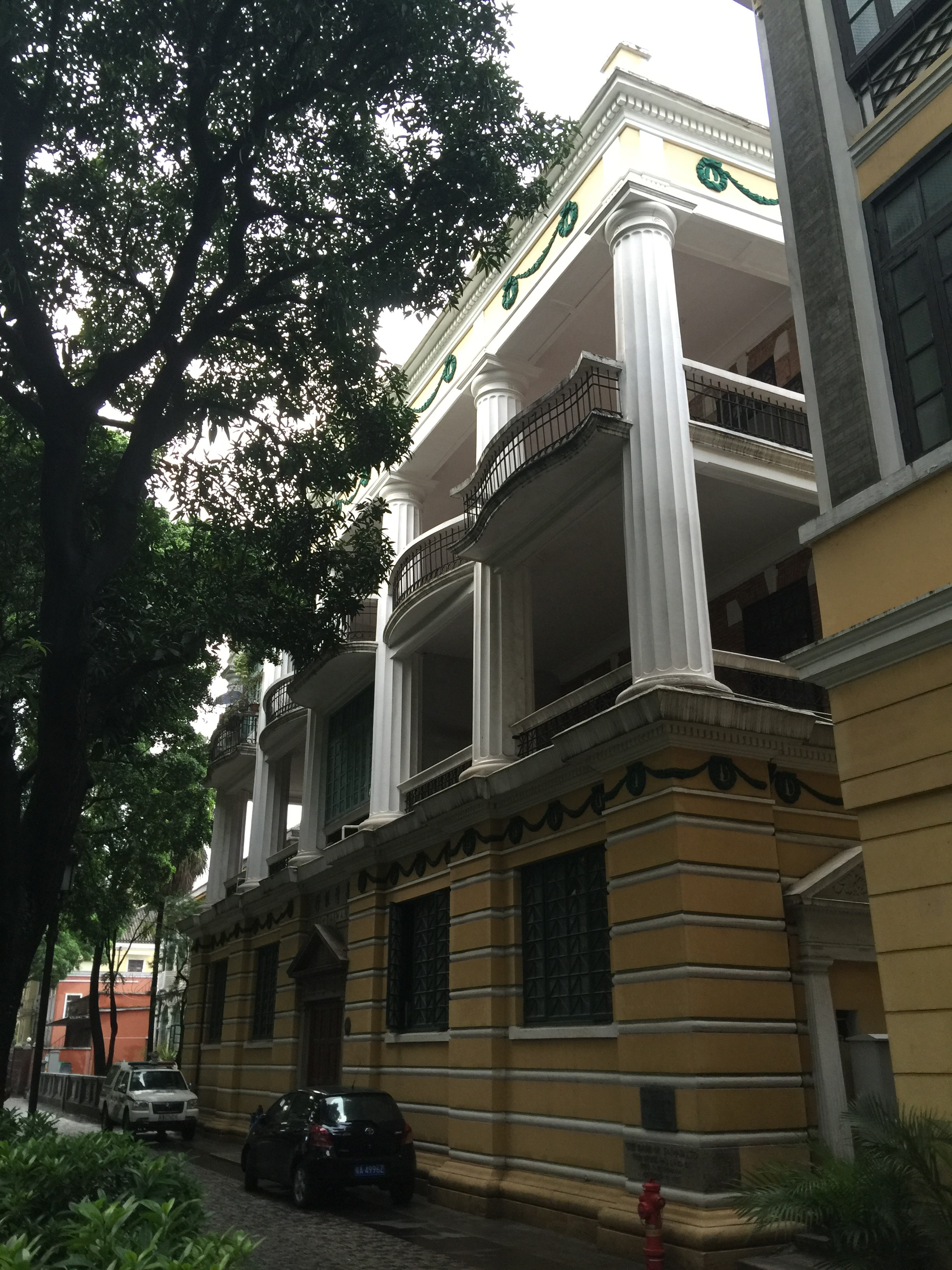
Former branch on Shamian Island in Guangzhou

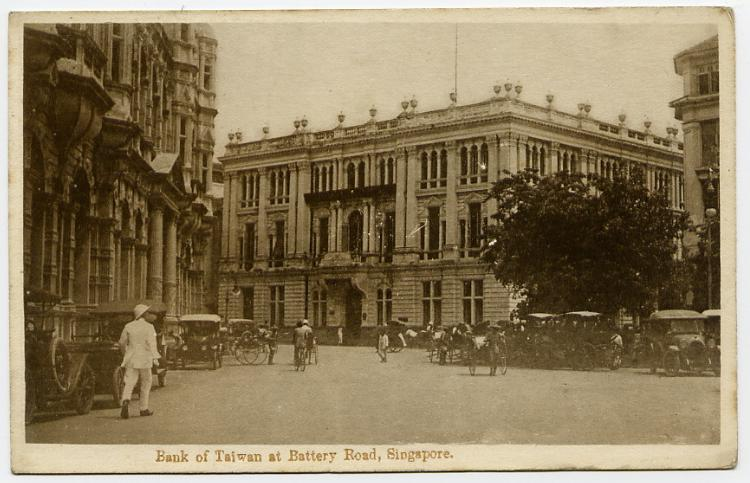
Former branch in Singapore, early 20th century postcard

Former branch in Semarang, photographed ca. 1927

== See also ==
- The Bank of Taiwan Building in Shanghai, mainland China
- Economy of Taiwan
- List of banks in Taiwan
- List of companies of Taiwan
- Old Taiwan dollar
- Taiwanese yen
