= Yilan Museum of Art =

Museum in Yilan City, Yilan County, Taiwan

- 宜蘭美術館
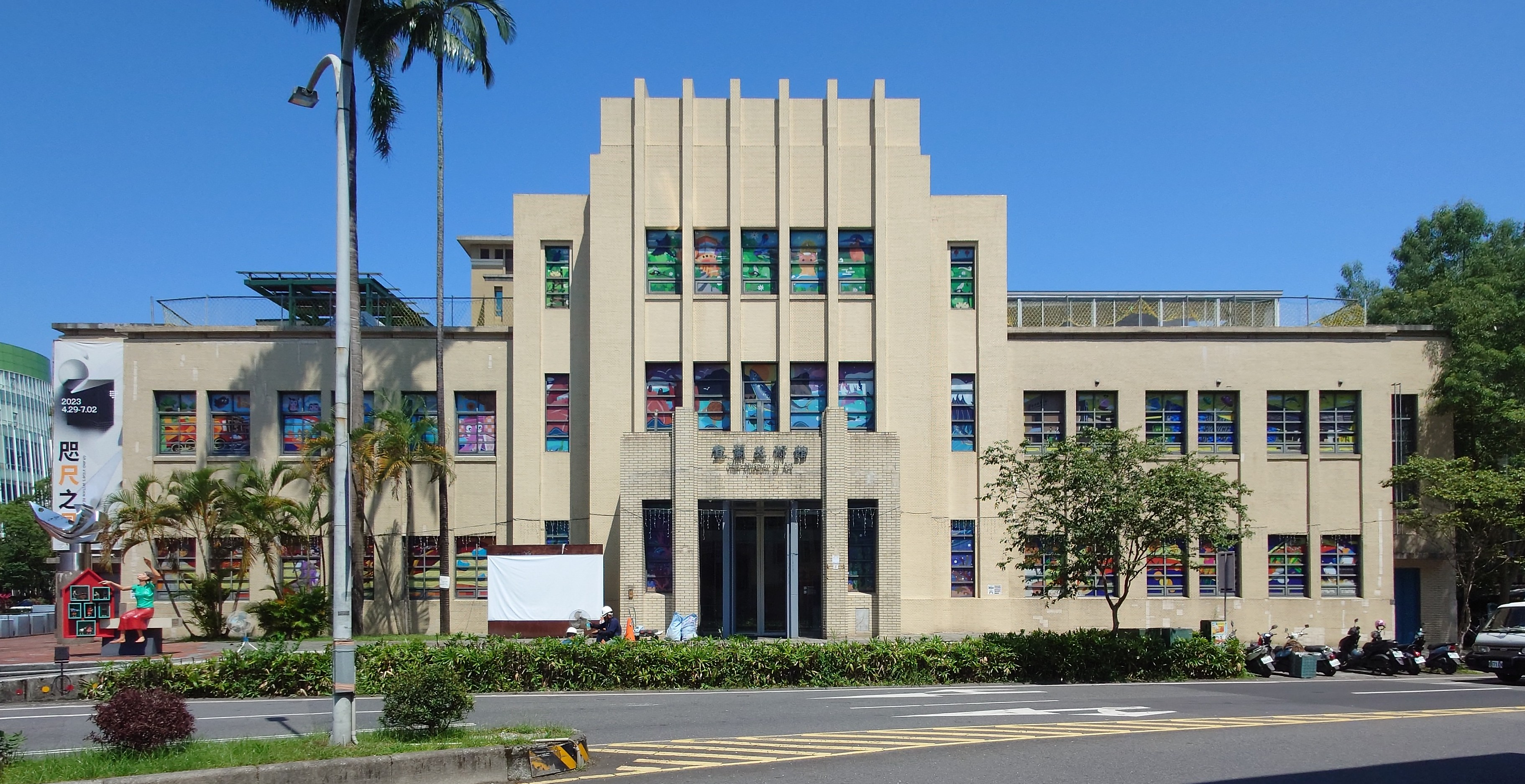
- Former name: Yilan Branch of Bank of Taiwan
- Established: 16 November 2014; 11 years ago
- Location: Yilan City, Yilan County, Taiwan
- Coordinates: 24°45′18.0″N 121°45′06.4″E
- Type: art museum
- Architect: Fieldoffice Architects
- Website: Official website (in Chinese)

The Yilan Museum of Art (YMA; traditional Chinese: 宜蘭美術館; simplified Chinese: 宜兰美术馆; pinyin: Yílán Měishùguǎn) is an art museum in Yilan City, Yilan County, Taiwan.

== History ==
The original museum building was destroyed during World War II. In 1949, it was reconstructed as the Yilan branch of the Bank of Taiwan. The Yilan County Government later designated the area a historic landmark. The bank donated the building in 2012. The museum started its trial operation beginning on 16 November 2014 with exhibitions running free of charge until 23 February 2015.

== Architecture ==
The building covers an area of more than 2,000 m^{2}. It was designed by Fieldoffice Architects.

== Exhibitions ==
The museum exhibits works made by local artists and also promoting local culture.

== Transportation ==
The museum is accessible within walking distance west of Yilan Station of Taiwan Railway.
