= Yilan Literary Museum =

Museum in Yilan City, Yilan County, Taiwan

- 宜蘭文學館
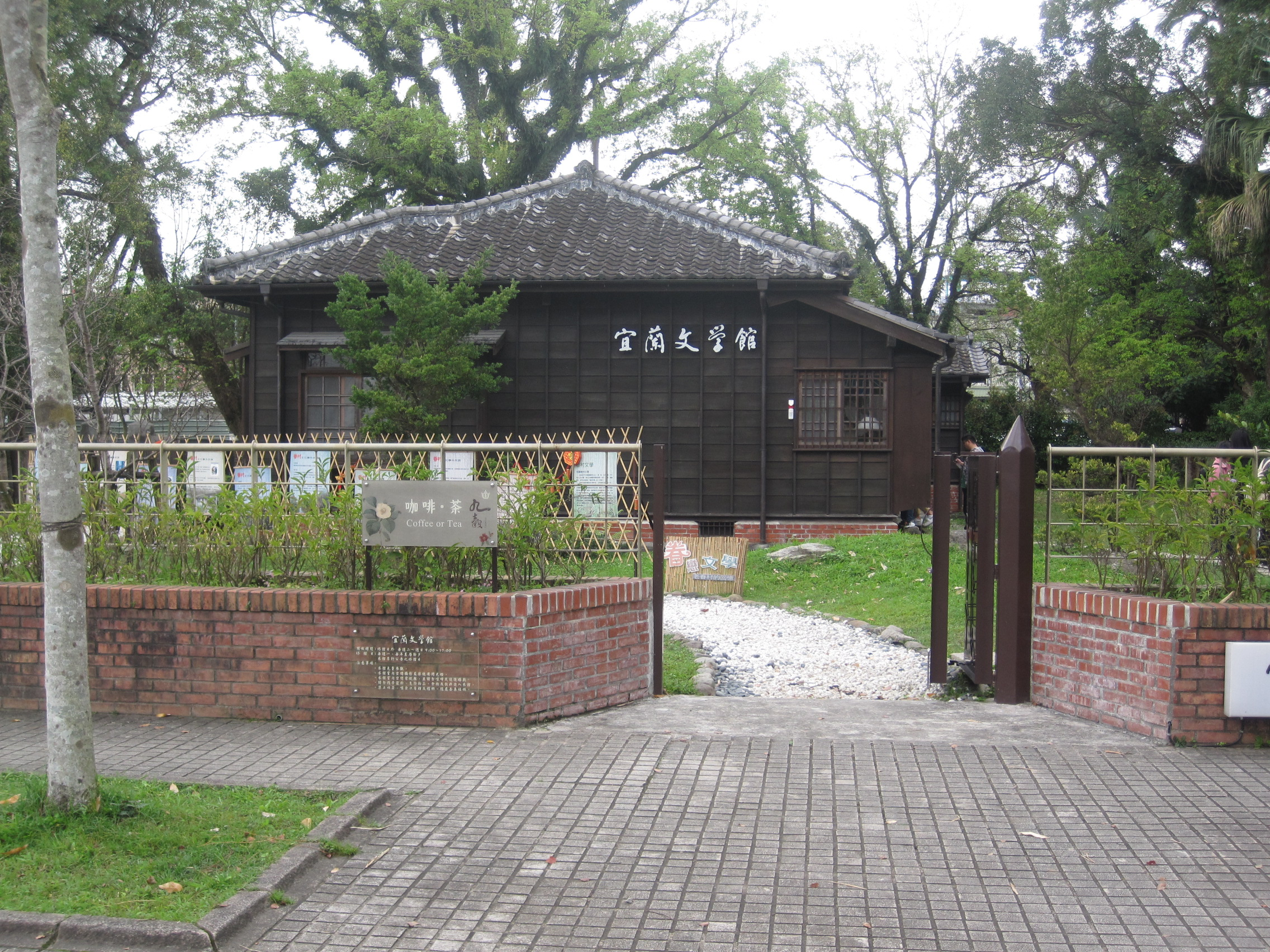
- Location: Yilan City, Yilan County, Taiwan
- Coordinates: 24°45′18.3″N 121°44′58.1″E
- Type: museum
- Public transit access: Yilan Station

The Yilan Literary Museum (traditional Chinese: 宜蘭文學館; simplified Chinese: 宜兰文学馆; pinyin: Yílán Wénxué Guǎn) is a museum in Yilan City, Yilan County, Taiwan.

== History ==
The museum building was originally a principal's quarter of a school of agriculture. Later it was turned into Yilan Music Museum and then Yilan Literary Museum. It was declared a historical building in 2001 and was renovated in 2004.

== Architecture ==
The museum was constructed with Japanese architectural style. It consists of two buildings, which are the principal's quarter of the former school of agriculture and the old secretary-general mansion building. Currently the old secretary-general mansion building is used as the Kyukoku Restaurant.

== Transportation ==
The museum is accessible within walking distance west of Yilan Station of Taiwan Railway.

== See also ==
- List of museums in Taiwan
