= Yilan Brick Kiln =

Former kiln in Yilan City, Yilan County, Taiwan

Yilan Brick Kiln 宜蘭磚窯
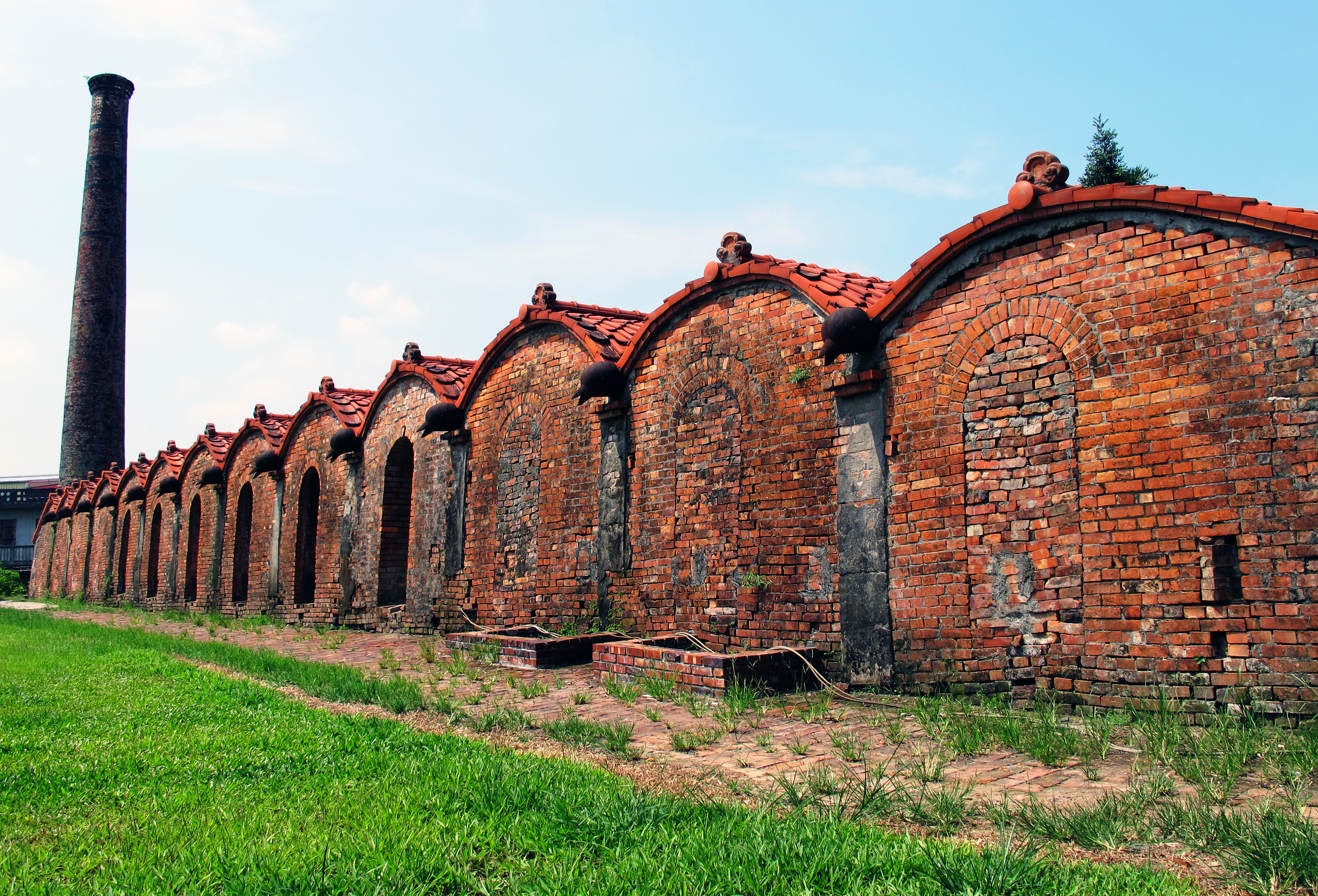
- Built: 1938
- Location: Yilan City, Yilan County, Taiwan
- Coordinates: 22°38′30.9″N 120°17′06.0″E
- Industry: manufacturing
- Products: brick
- Defunct: 1980s

The Yilan Brick Kiln (traditional Chinese: 宜蘭磚窯; simplified Chinese: 宜兰砖窑; pinyin: Yílán Zhuānyáo) is a former brick manufacturing factory in Beijin Village, Yilan City, Yilan County, Taiwan.

== History ==
In 1831, Yilan established its first own brick klin due to the discoveries of sites around Yilan which has high viscosity clay, which was suitable for bricks making. The Yilan Brick Kiln was originally established as Chen He Cheng Kiln Factory. It was later changed to Yilan Brick Kiln and ended its operation in the 1980s. In 1999, the Yilan County Government planned to build residential buildings within the area. However, after various oppositions from the local residents, the kiln was finally preserved.

== Architecture ==
The kiln is a rectangular-shaped building with a series of individual kilns. Each kiln can fire its own product and operate separately with exhaust holes connected to each other with a unified exhaust pipe. The kiln has brick domed roof and brick floors. It also has a 37-meter tall chimney.

== Transportation ==
The building is accessible within walking distance north of Yilan Station of Taiwan Railway.

== See also ==
- List of tourist attractions in Taiwan
- Former Tangrong Brick Kiln
