= Memorial Hall of Founding of Yilan Administration =

Memorial hall in Yilan City, Yilan County, Taiwan

Memorial Hall Founding of Yilan Administration
- 宜蘭設治記念館
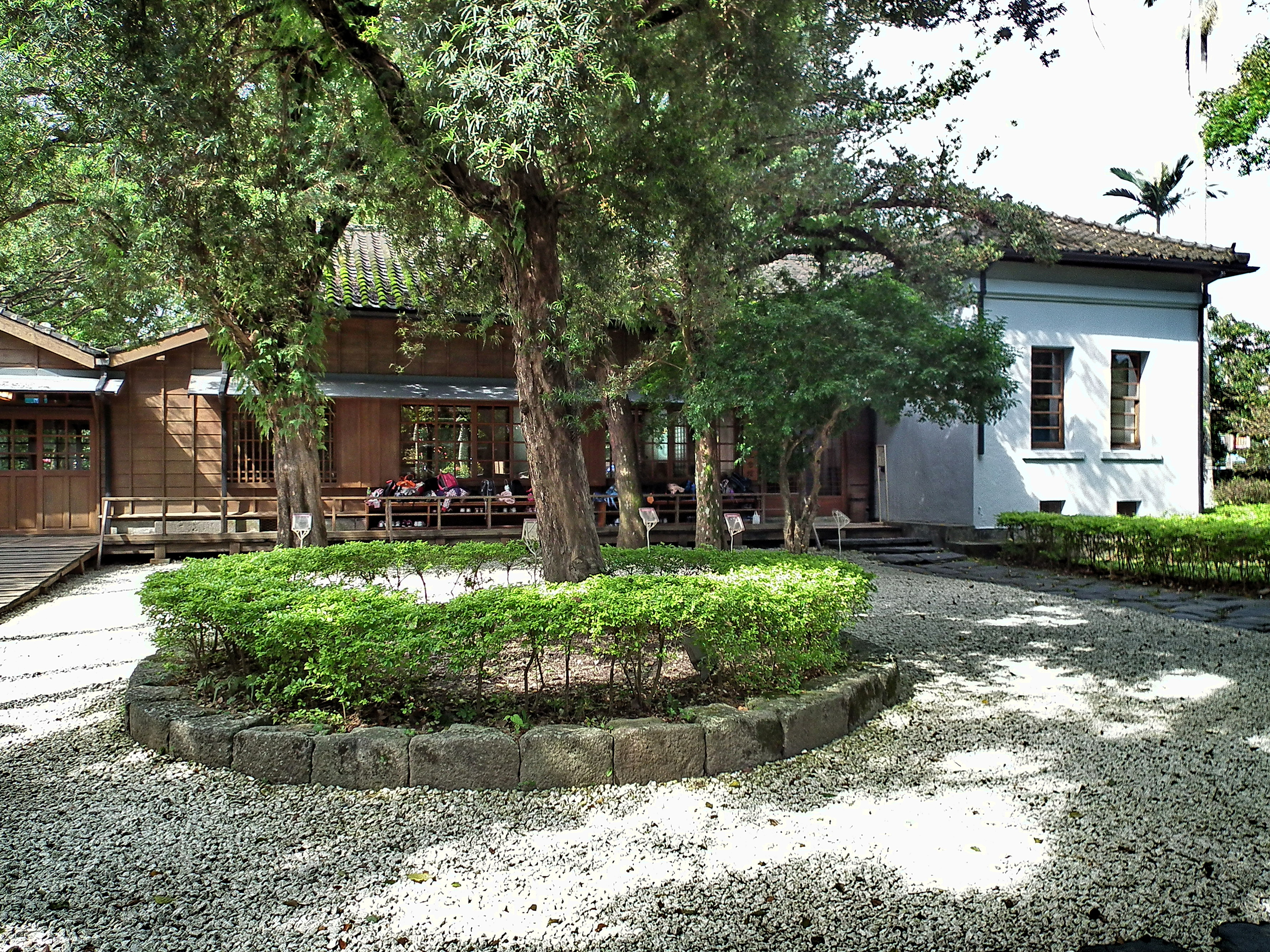
- Interactive map of the Memorial Hall Founding of Yilan Administration area

General information
- Location: Yilan City, Yilan County, Taiwan
- Coordinates: 24°45′19.1″N 121°44′58.7″E
- Completed: 1900
- Inaugurated: 13 December 1997

Website
- Official website

The Memorial Hall of Founding of Yilan Administration (traditional Chinese: 宜蘭設治紀念館; simplified Chinese: 宜兰设治纪念馆; pinyin: Yílán Shèzhì Jìniànguǎn; colloquially, Founding Memorial Hall) is a memorial hall dedicated to the founding of Yilan County Government located in Yilan City, Yilan County, Taiwan.

== History ==
The memorial hall building was originally built in 1900 where it used to be the official residence of magistrates. The building was later converted into a memorial hall and was inaugurated on 13 December 1997.

== Architecture ==
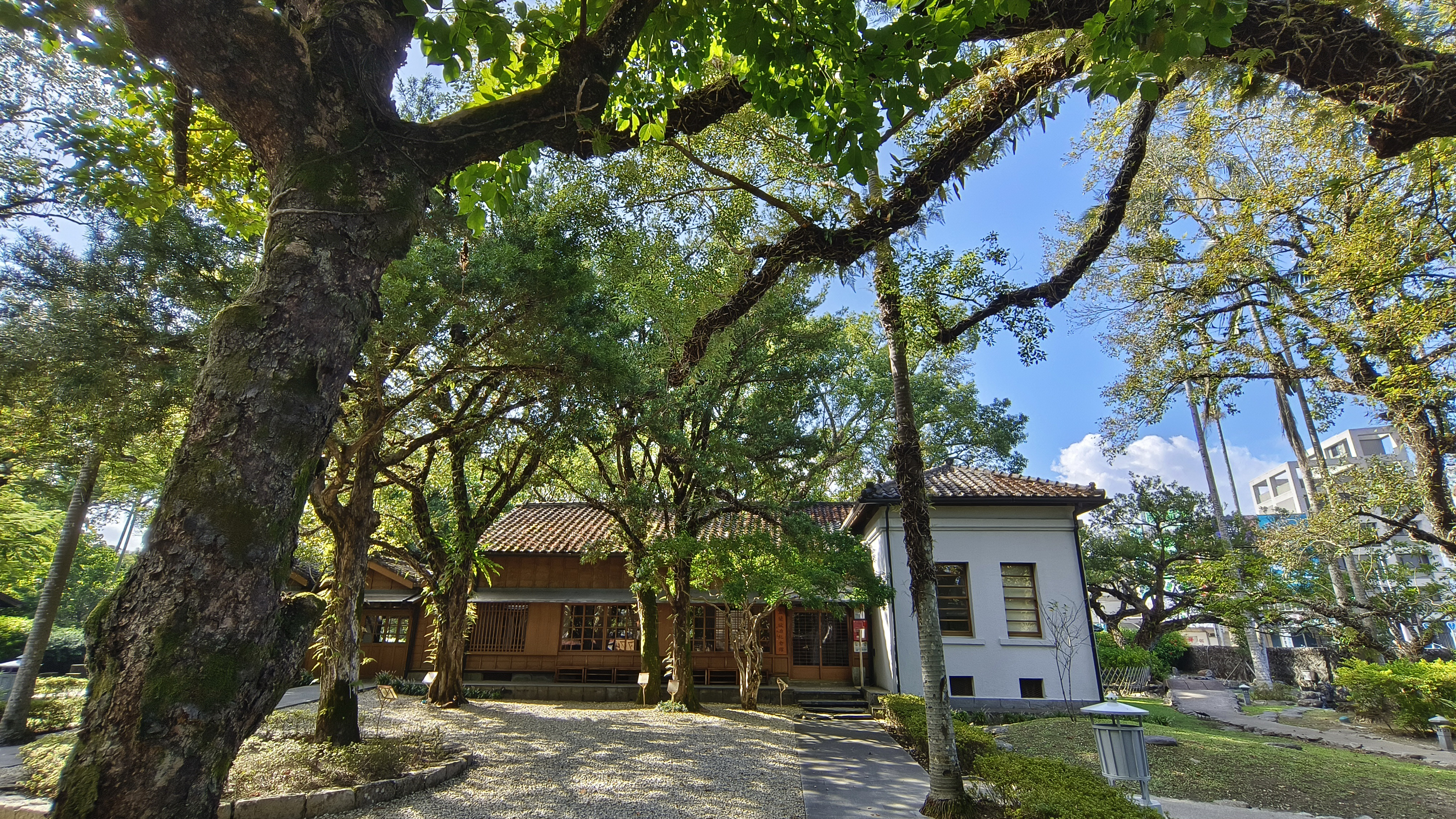
Memorial Hall of Founding of Yilan Administration

The total area of the memorial hall complex is 2,648 m^{2} and with a building space of 245 m^{2}. It is a mix of Japanese wooden house and western classical building style.

== Exhibitions ==
The memorial hall displays major historical events in Yilan County.

== Transportation ==
The memorial hall is accessible within walking distance west of Yilan Station of Taiwan Railway.

== See also ==
- List of tourist attractions in Taiwan
