= Taiwan Financial Holdings Group =

Taiwanese state-owned financial services company

Taiwan Financial Holdings Co., Ltd. 臺灣金融控股公司
- Company type: State-owned
- Industry: Banking
- Founded: Taiwan 2007/12/6 approved 2008/1/1 business commenced
- Headquarters: Taipei, Taiwan
- Area served: Republic of China; United States; United Kingdom; Singapore; Japan; South Africa; Hong Kong
- Products: Financial services
- Total assets: ▲NT$ 5,480.60 billion (2008)
- Number of employees: 14,475 (30 June 2008)
- Parent: Ministry of Finance (Taiwan)
- Subsidiaries: Bank of Taiwan (台灣銀行); BankTaiwan Securities (臺銀證券); BankTaiwan Life Insurance (臺銀人壽)
- Website: www.twfhc.com.tw

Taiwan Financial Holdings Co., Ltd.
- Traditional Chinese: 臺灣金融控股公司
- Simplified Chinese: 台湾金融控股公司
Transcriptions
Standard Mandarin
- Hanyu Pinyin: Táiwān Jīnróng Kònggǔ Gōngsī
Southern Min
- Hokkien POJ: Tâi-oân Kim-iông Khòng-kó͘ Kong-si
- Tâi-lô: Tâi-uân Kim-iông Khòng-koó Kong-si

Taiwan Financial Holdings Co., Ltd. (Chinese: 臺灣金融控股公司; pinyin: Táiwān Jīnróng Kònggǔ Gōngsī; Pe̍h-ōe-jī: Tâi-oân Kim-iông Khòng-kó͘ Kong-si) is a Taiwan based state-owned corporation that is the parent holding company of the Bank of Taiwan, BankTaiwan Securities and BankTaiwan Life Insurance.

Founded in 2007 and commenced in 2008 through the legislative approval of the merger, it is the largest financial institution in Taiwan. Today the Group is the 18th largest financial institution in Asia and 89th largest in the world, with assets of NT$5,458.59 billion and net worth of NT$373.17 billion as of March, 2008.

== History ==
- In January 2008, the Bank of Taiwan became part of the Taiwan Financial Holdings Co., Ltd.(臺灣金融控股公司), which was resulted in the merger of the Bank of Taiwan (台灣銀行), Land Bank of Taiwan (台灣土地銀行), The Export–Import Bank of China (中國輸出入銀行), BankTaiwan Securities and BankTaiwan Life Insurance. This is now Taiwan's largest financial institution. The merger was filed to report in accordance with the Fair Trade Law.
- On June 28, 2008, the Government of Taiwan approved a draft law which allowed Taiwan Financial Holdings to acquire other financial companies. The Government also approved the withdrawal of Export-Import Bank of China from the holding company.
- On July 21, 2008, the Government of Taiwan planned of a future release of 20% stake in the state-owned Taiwan Financial Holdings to foreign strategic partners and allowed them to join the company's board of directors. This will be effective once the ratification of the draft Statute for Taiwan Financial Holdings has been complete, scheduled in September 2008.

== Merger and acquisitions ==
In 2008, the banks and financial institutions Bank of Taiwan, Land Bank of Taiwan, The Export-Import Bank of China, BankTaiwan Securities and BankTaiwan Life Insurance merged into a single parent holding company, Taiwan Financial Holdings Group (臺灣金融控股公司).

Taiwan Financial Holdings Co. Ltd. filed a merger report in accordance with the Fair Trade Law under Article 6, 11 and 12. The merger report concluded that this will result in the possession of more than 15% of the deposit and loan market and there is no obvious danger of restriction on market competition. The report concluded that the meeting on October 4, 2007 decided the benefits brought by the merger outweigh the negative.

== Subsidiaries ==
- Asia Pacific
  - Bank of Taiwan (台灣銀行)
  - BankTaiwan Securities (臺銀證券)
  - BankTaiwan Life Insurance (臺銀人壽)

== See also ==
- List of banks in Taiwan
- Economy of Taiwan
- List of companies of Taiwan
