= Former Yilan Prison =

Prison in Yilan City, Yilan County, Taiwan

Former Yilan Prison 舊宜蘭監獄門廳
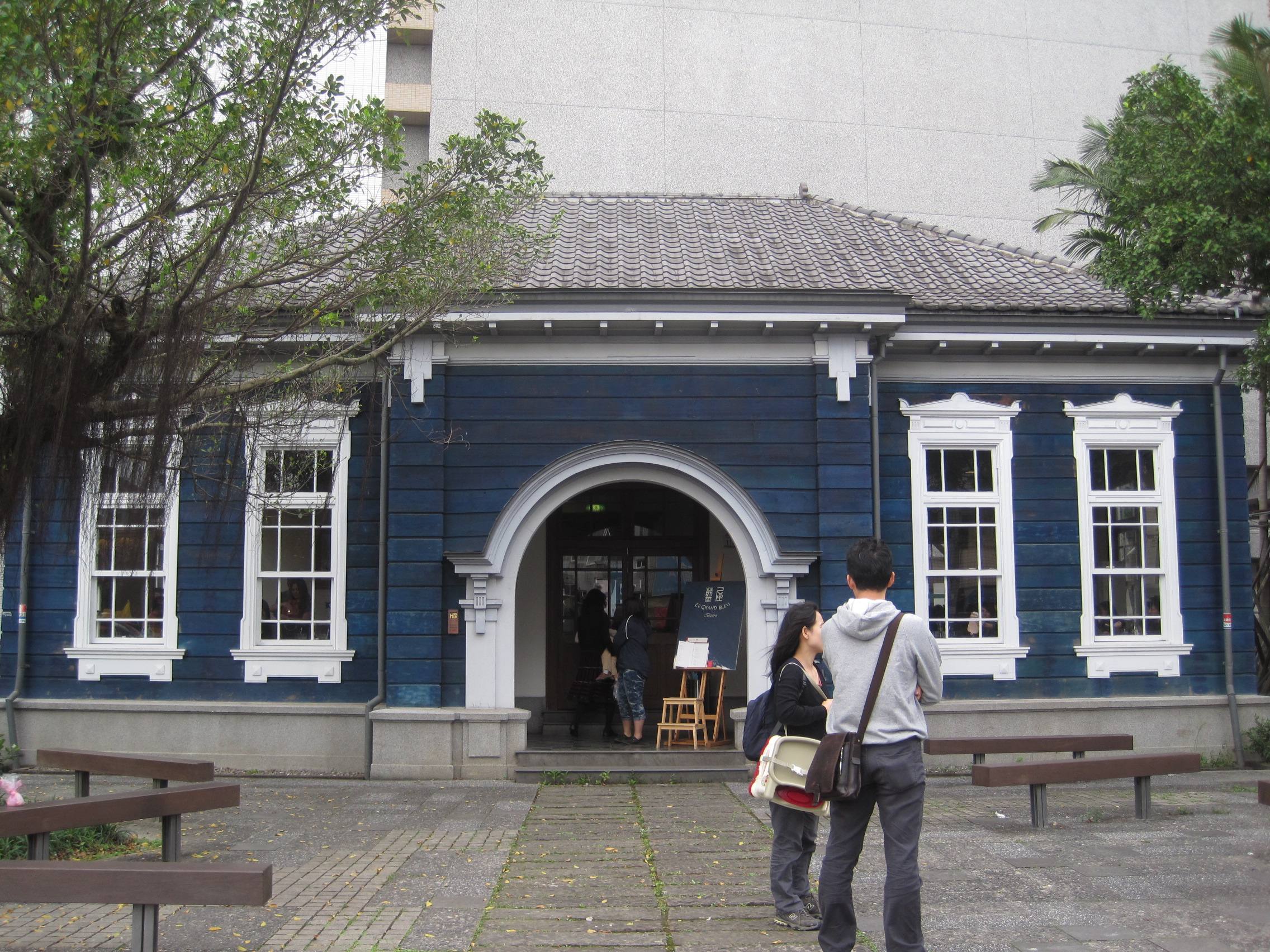

- Taiwan
- Location: Yilan City, Yilan County, Taiwan; 24°45′13.8″N 121°45′05.6″E
- Status: Closed
- Opened: 1896
- Closed: 1993

The Former Yilan Prison (traditional Chinese: 舊宜蘭監獄門廳; simplified Chinese: 旧宜兰监狱门厅; pinyin: Jiù Yílán Jiānyù Méntīng) is a former prison in Yilan City, Yilan County, Taiwan.

== History ==
The prison was originally founded in 1896 with the name Yilan Branch Institute of Taipei Punishment Institute. It was then renamed to First Branch Prison of Taiwan First Prison in December 1945 and again to Taiwan Yilan Prison on 1 April 1947. In 1984, the prison committee bought a new land plot in Sanxing Township and the prison was then relocated and officially opened on 19 July 1993. The building is the oldest prison structure in Taiwan.

== Architecture ==
Front entrance of the former prison

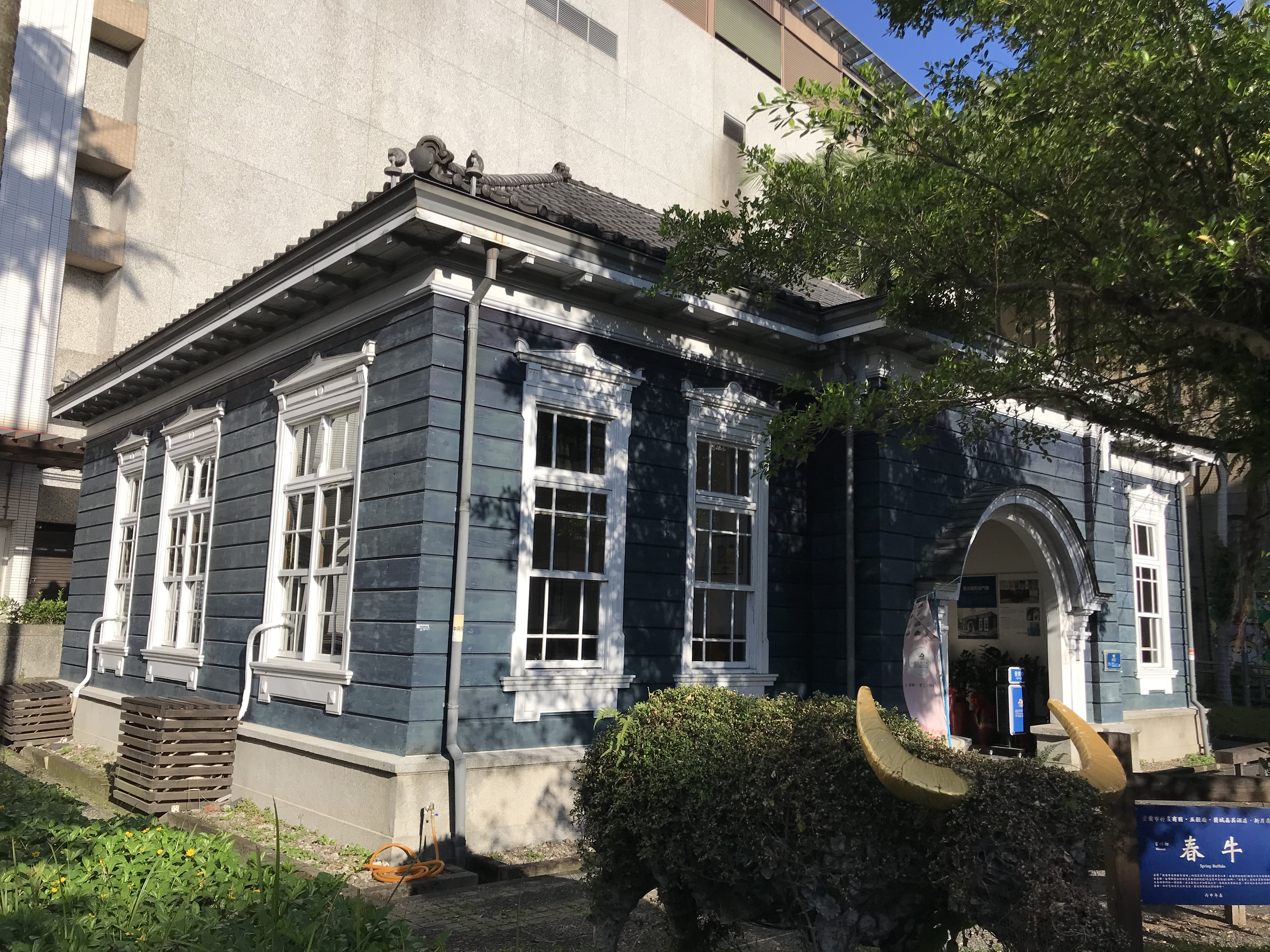
Right side of the entrance hall

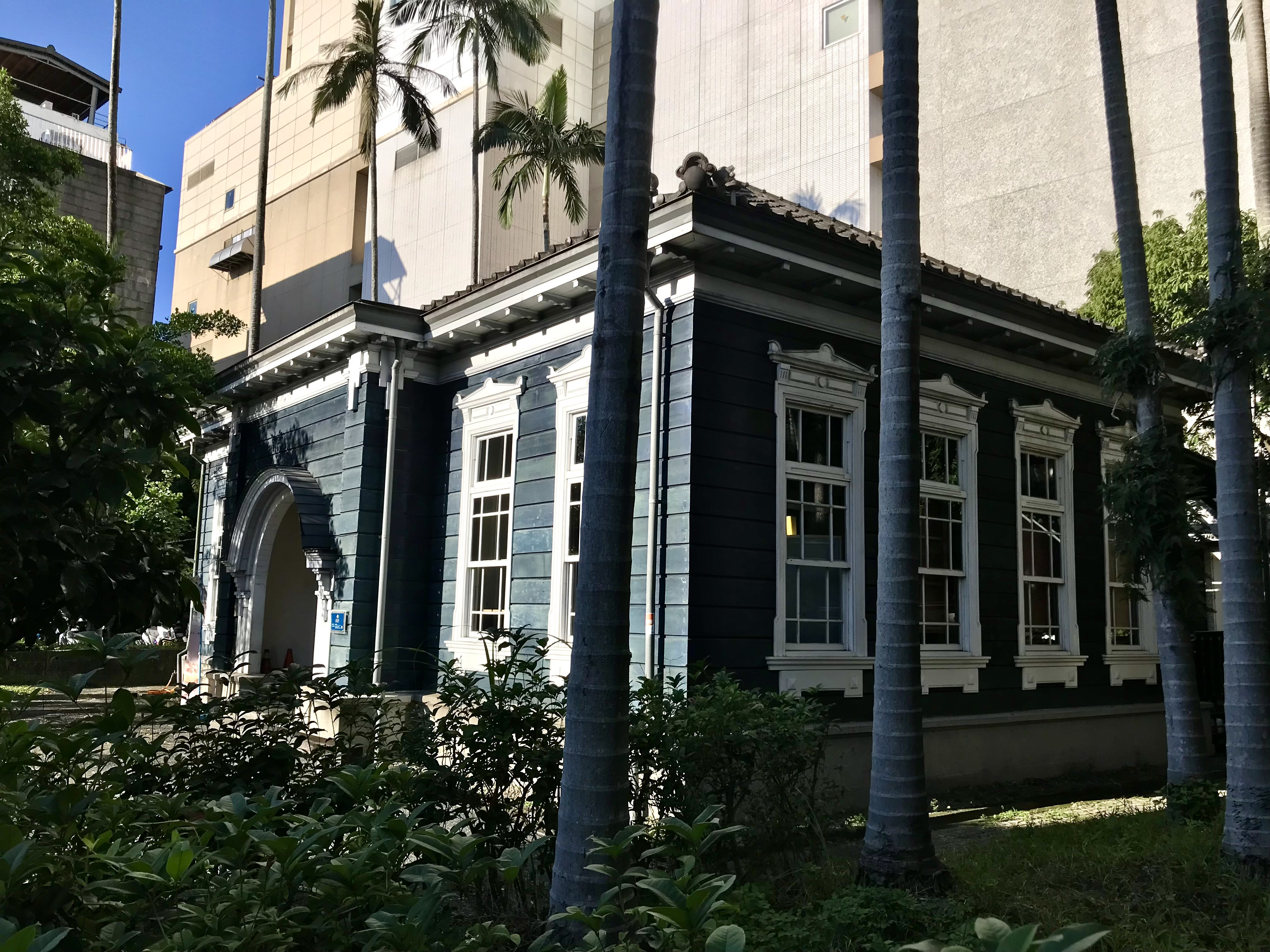
Left side of the entrance hall

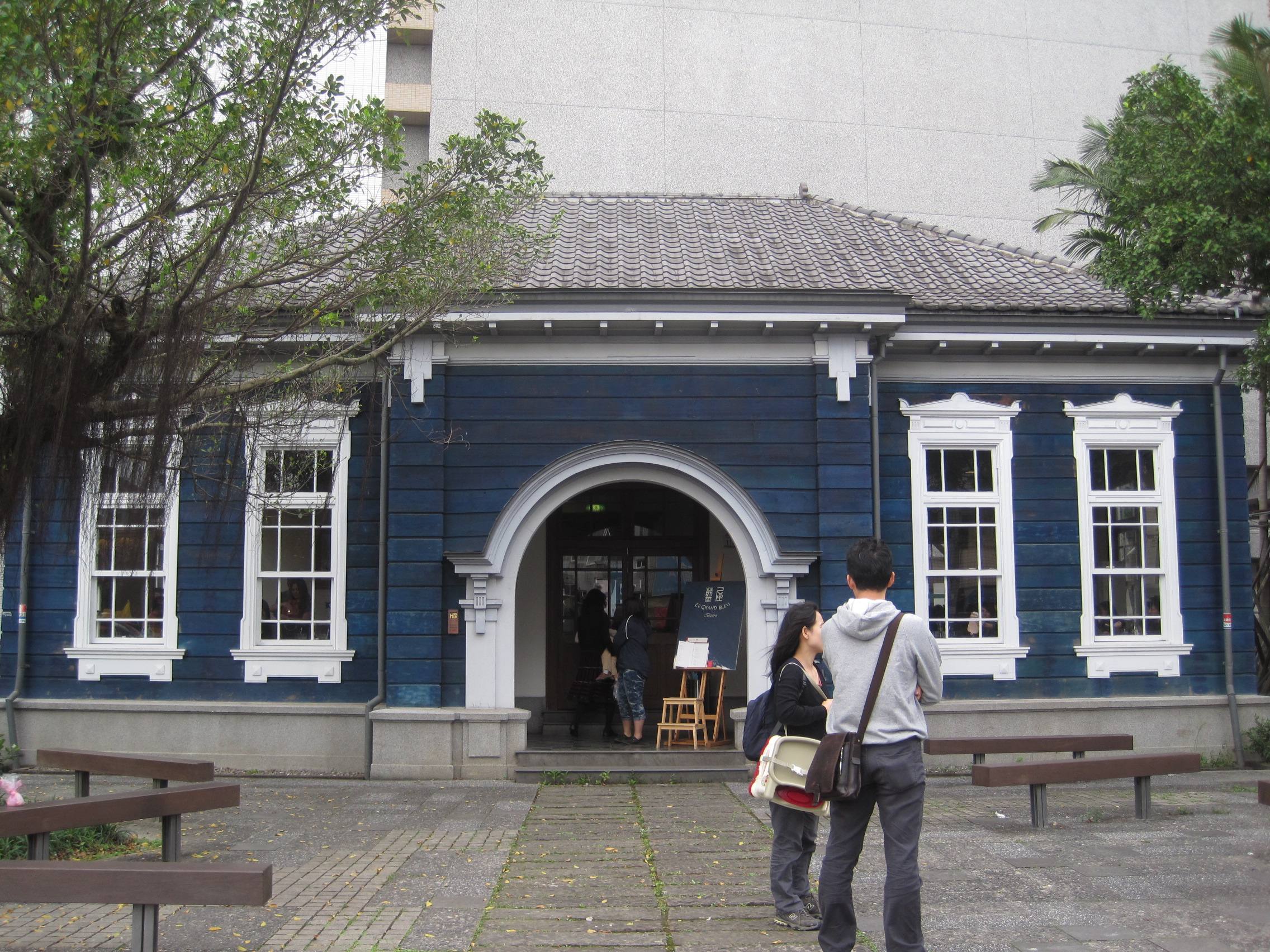
The former prison entrance hall

The entrance hall and watchtower

== Transportation ==
The building is accessible within walking distance west of Yilan Station of Taiwan Railway.

== See also ==
- List of tourist attractions in Taiwan
