= Bank of Taiwan Building =

Building in The Bund, Shanghai, China

Coordinates: 31°14′17″N 121°29′23″E

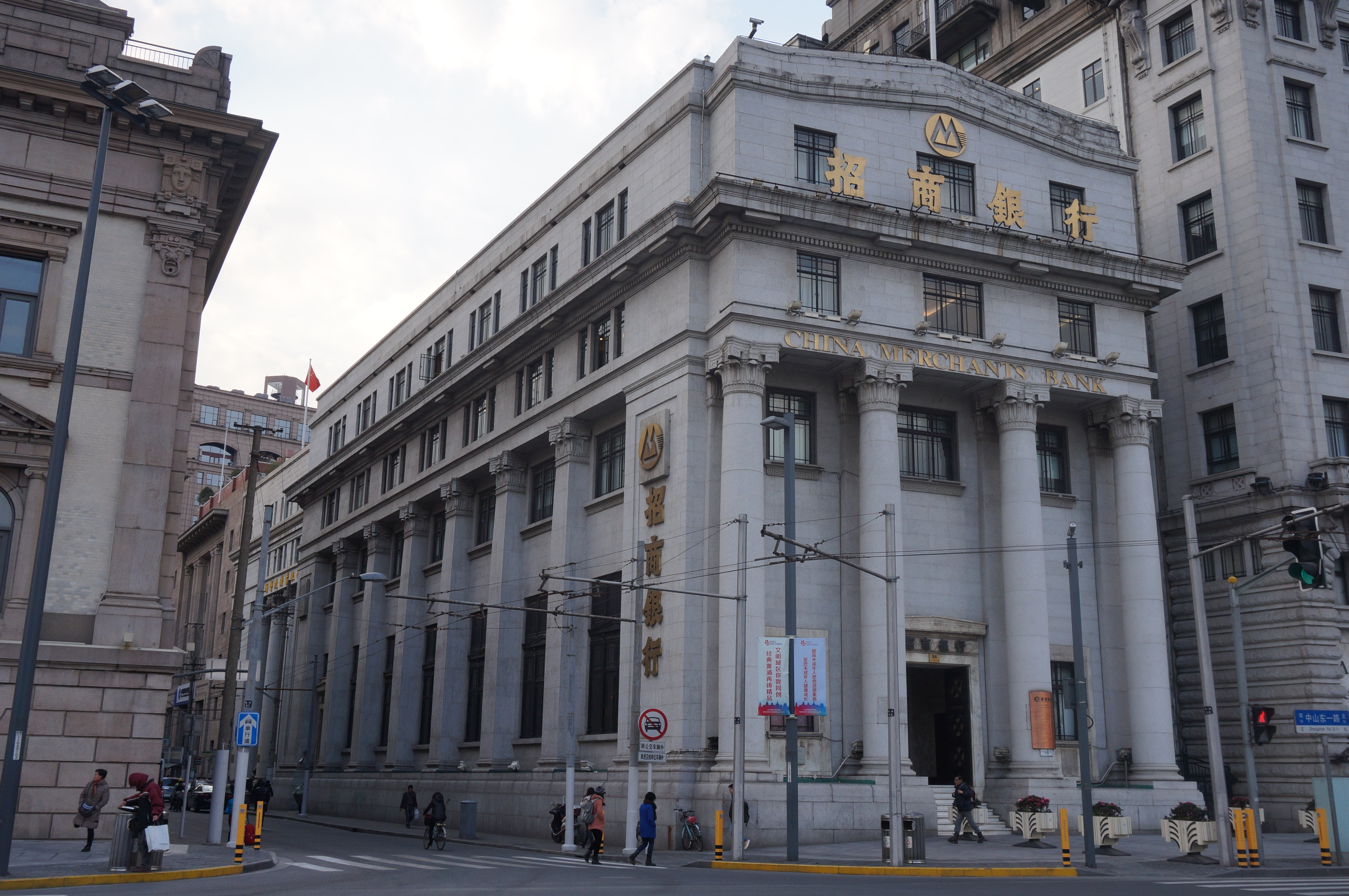
The Bank of Taiwan Building was completed in 1924, and combines Japanese and Western architectural elements.

The Bank of Taiwan Building (Chinese: 台湾银行大楼) is located at No. 16, The Bund, Shanghai, China. Taiwan was ceded by the Qing Empire to the Japanese Empire as a result of the First Sino-Japanese War, and in 1899 founded the Bank of Taiwan to promote trade between Taiwan, the Japanese Empire, and the rest of Asia. The bank then began opening offices outside of Taiwan in order to facilitate inter-regional trade.

The present building was completed in 1924, and replaced an earlier building on the site. Its architecture combines both Western and Japanese elements. The building is now a branch of China Merchants Bank.

== Bibliography ==
- Shea, Marilyn. "The Bund - Picture Guide to Historic Buildings". The University of Maine. 2007. Retrieved September 22, 2012.
