= Yilan City =

County-administered city in Yilan County, Taiwan

Yilan 宜蘭市 Giran, I-ran
- County-administered city
- Yilan City
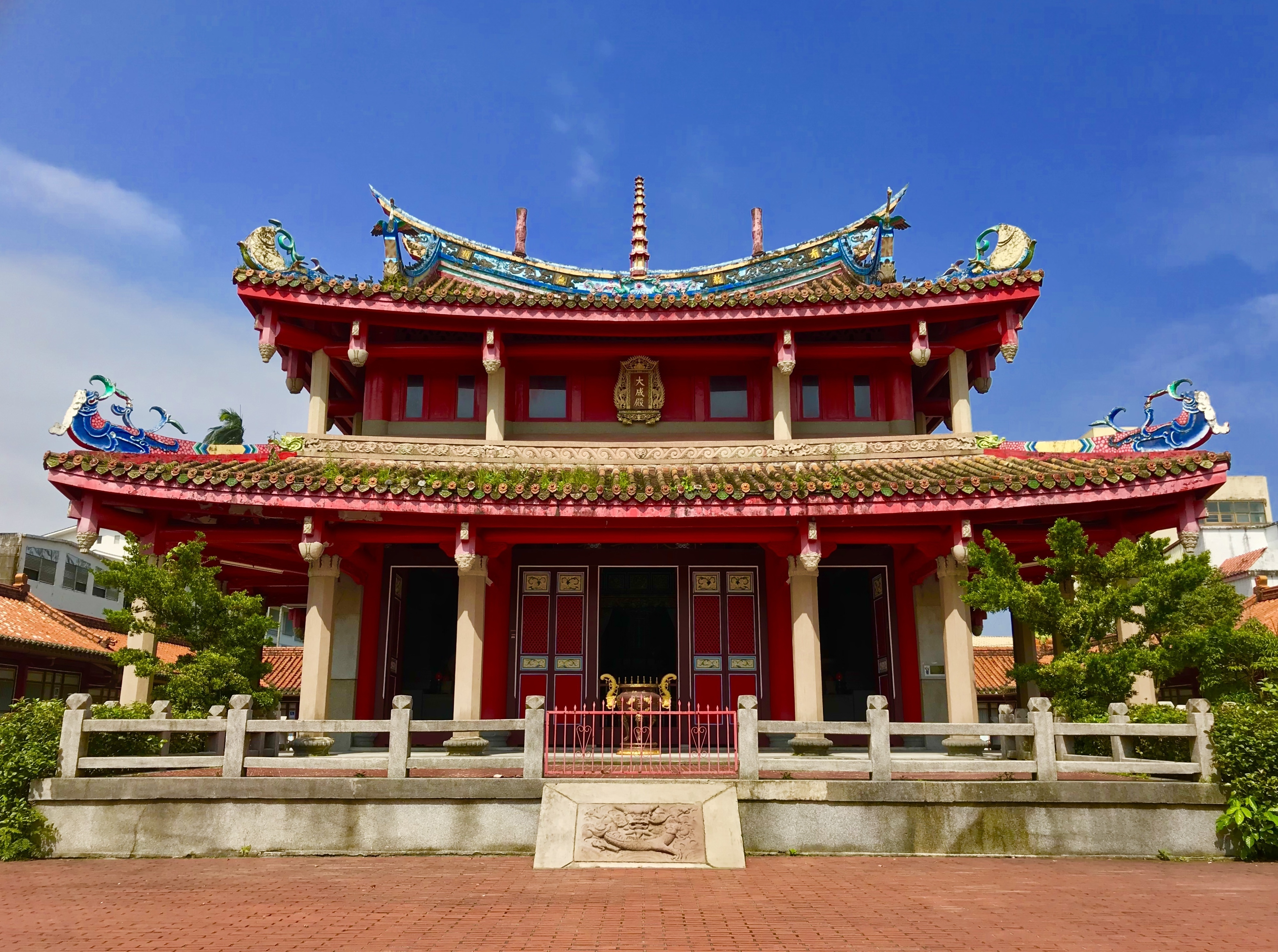
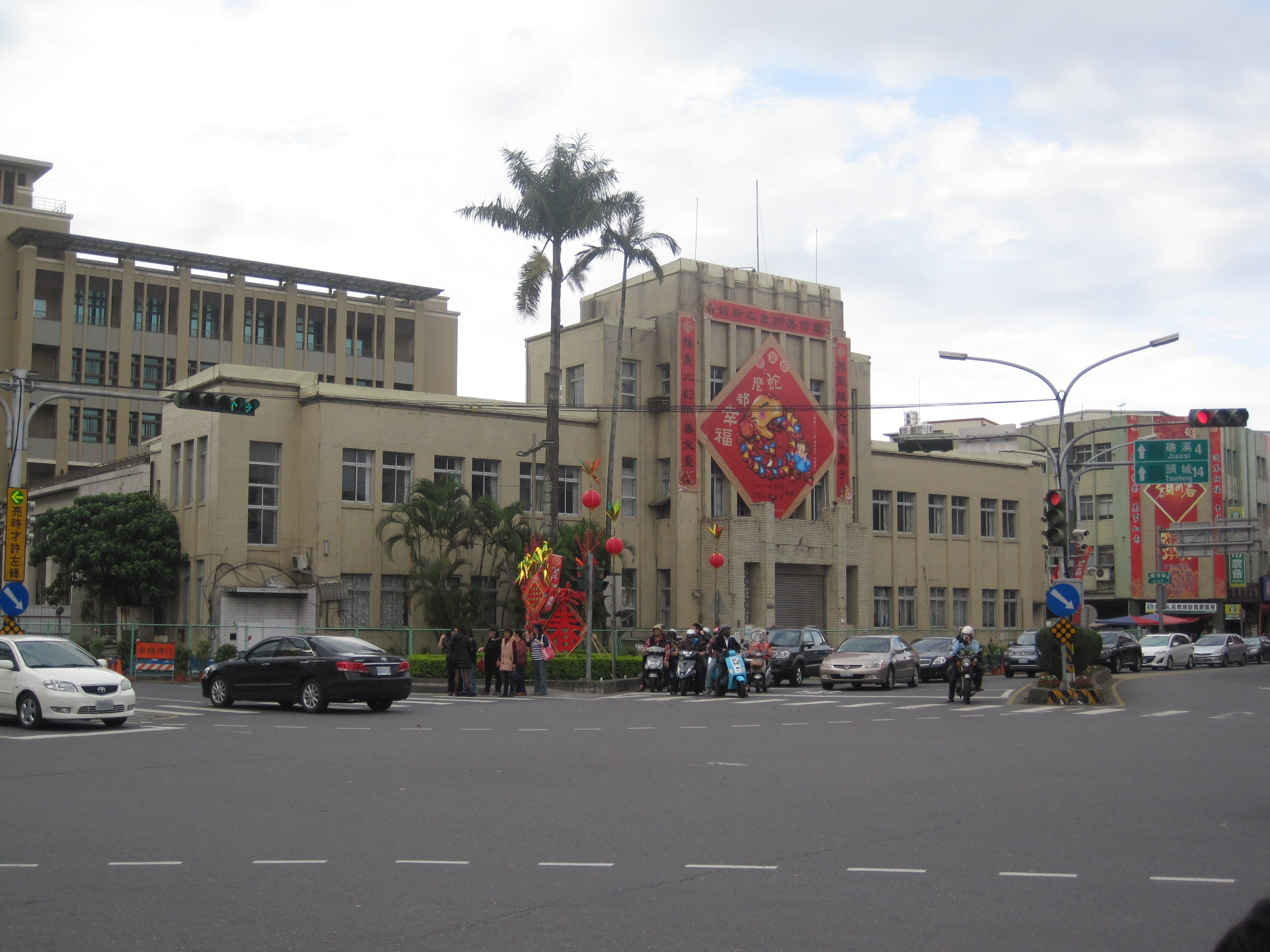
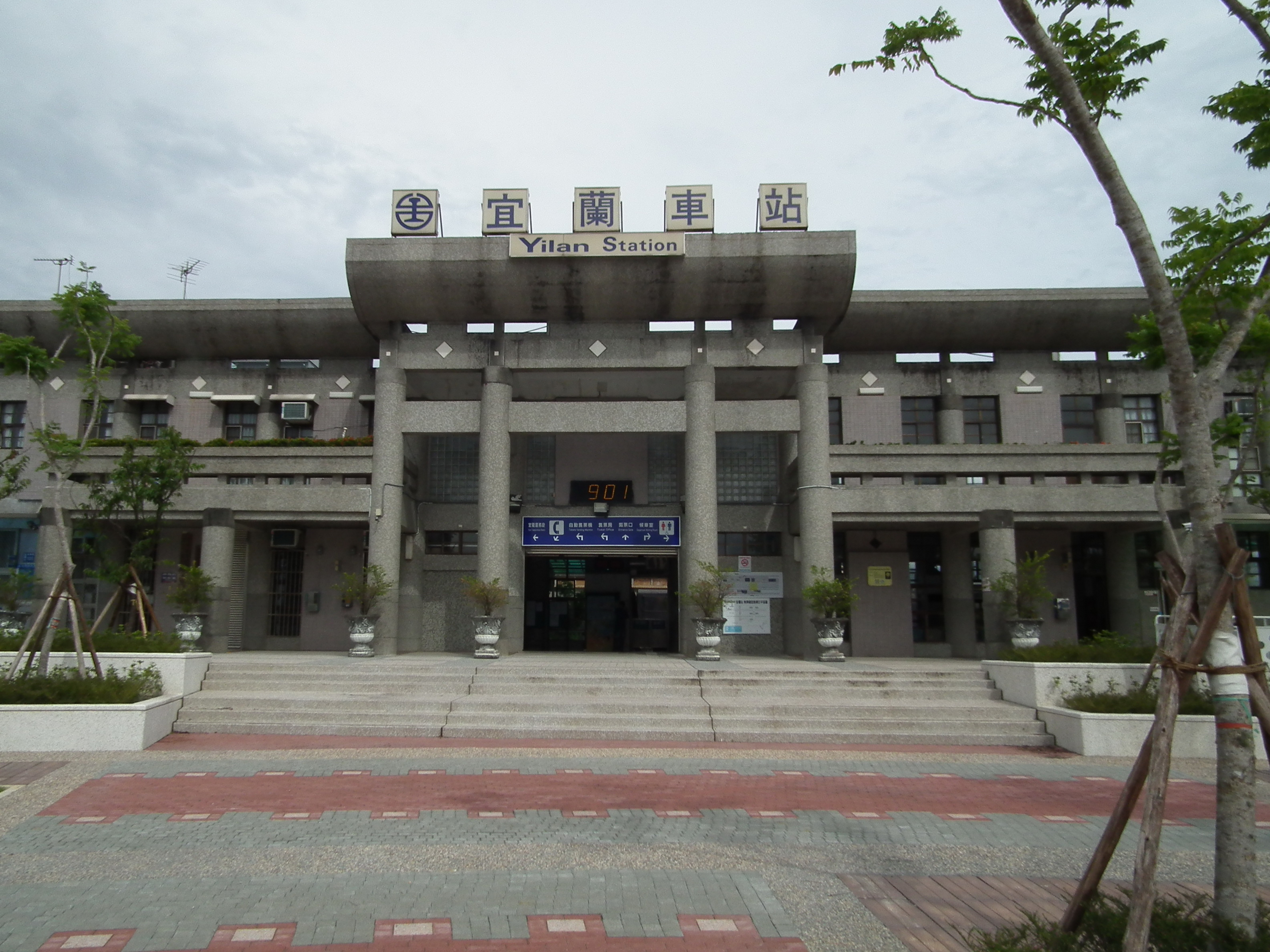
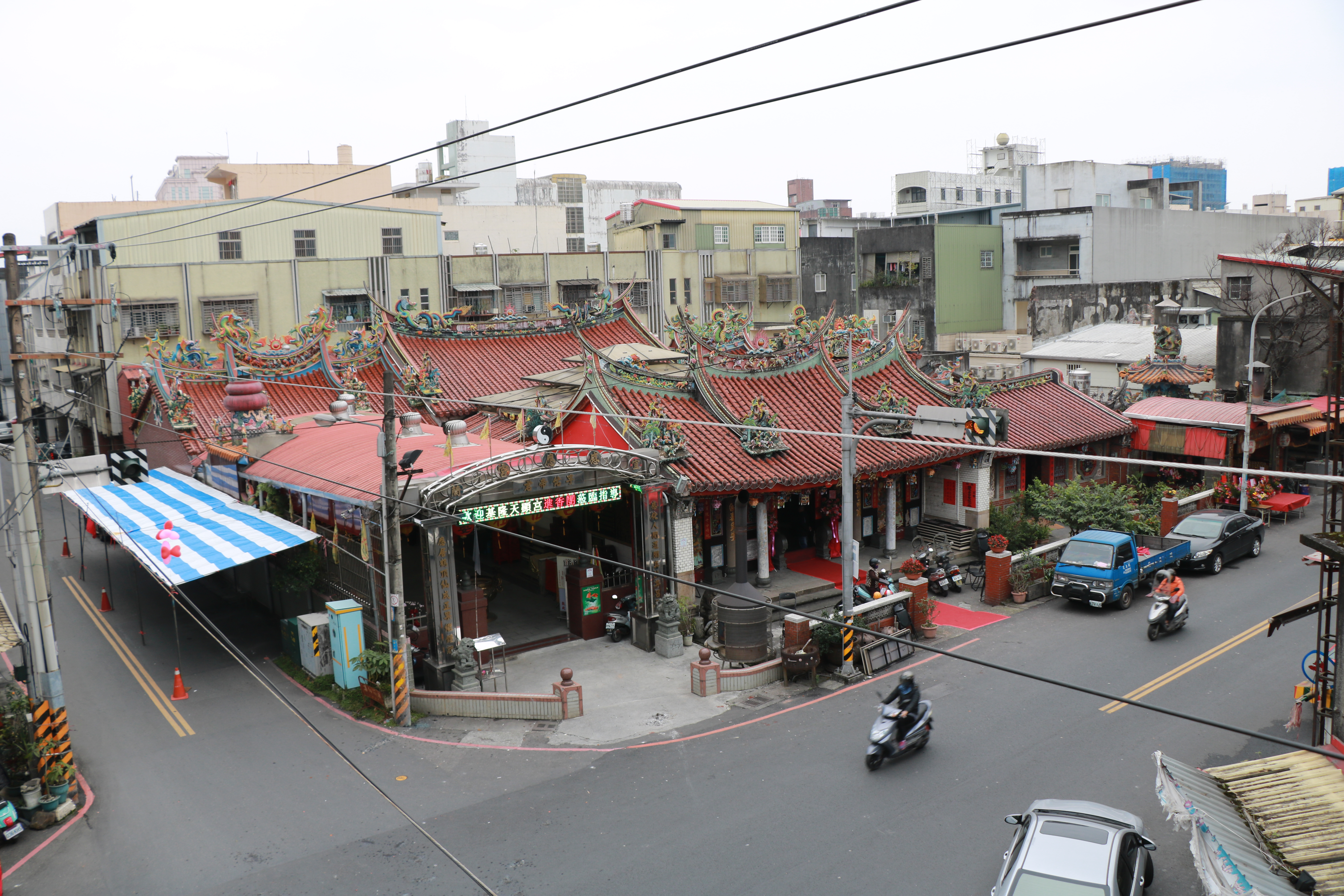
- Clockwise: Yilan Confucian Temple, Former branch office of the Bank of Taiwan in 2013, Yilan train station, and Yilan Chenghuang temple

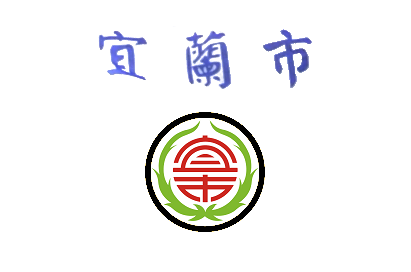
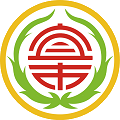
- Flag Seal

- Location in Taiwan
- Coordinates: 24°45′N 121°45′E
- Country: Taiwan
- County: Yilan
- Urban villages (里): 38

Government
  - Mayor: Chiang Tsung-yuan

Area
  - Total: 29.87 km^{2} (11.53 sq mi)

Population (September 2023)
  - Total: 95,019
  - Density: 3,181/km^{2} (8,239/sq mi)
- Time zone: UTC+8 (National Standard Time)
- Postal code: 260
- Website: yilan.e-land.gov.tw

Yilan City
- Traditional Chinese: 宜蘭市
Transcriptions
Standard Mandarin
- Hanyu Pinyin: yí lán shì
- Bopomofo: ㄧˊ ㄌㄢˊ ㄕˋ
- Gwoyeu Romatzyh: Yilan Shyh
- Wade–Giles: I^{2}-lan^{2} Shih^{4}
- Tongyong Pinyin: Yílán Shìh
- MPS2: Yílán Shr̀
- IPA: [ǐ.lǎn ʂɻ̩̂]
Hakka
- Pha̍k-fa-sṳ: Ngì-làn-sṳ
Southern Min
- Hokkien POJ: Gî-lân-chhī
- Tâi-lô: Gî-lân-tshī

Yilan City (Mandarin pinyin: Yílán Shì; Hokkien POJ: Gî-lân-chhī) is a county-administered city and the county seat of Yilan County, Taiwan. The city lies on the north side of the Lanyang River.

== History ==
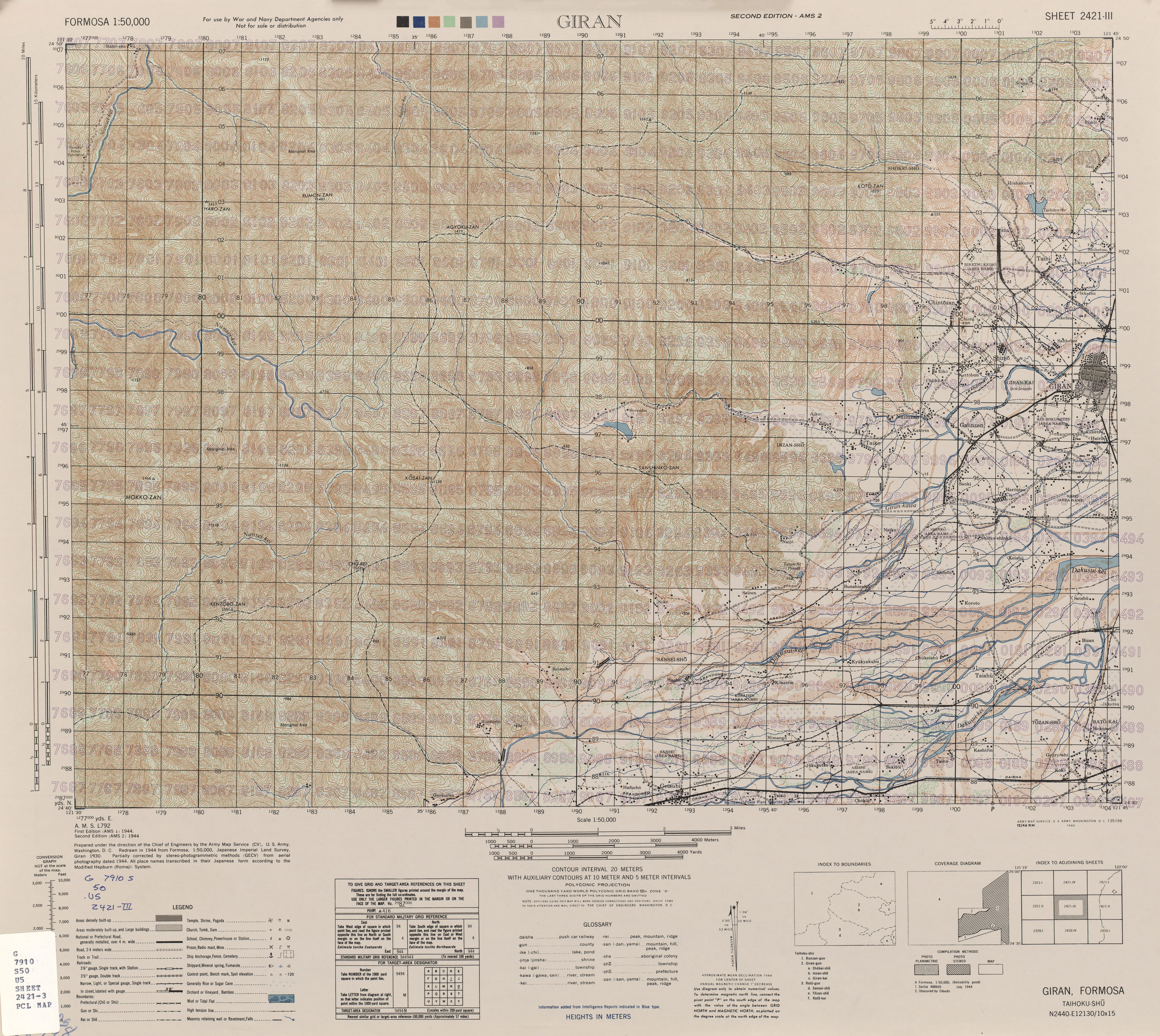
Map of Yilan (labeled as GIRAN) and surrounding area (1944).

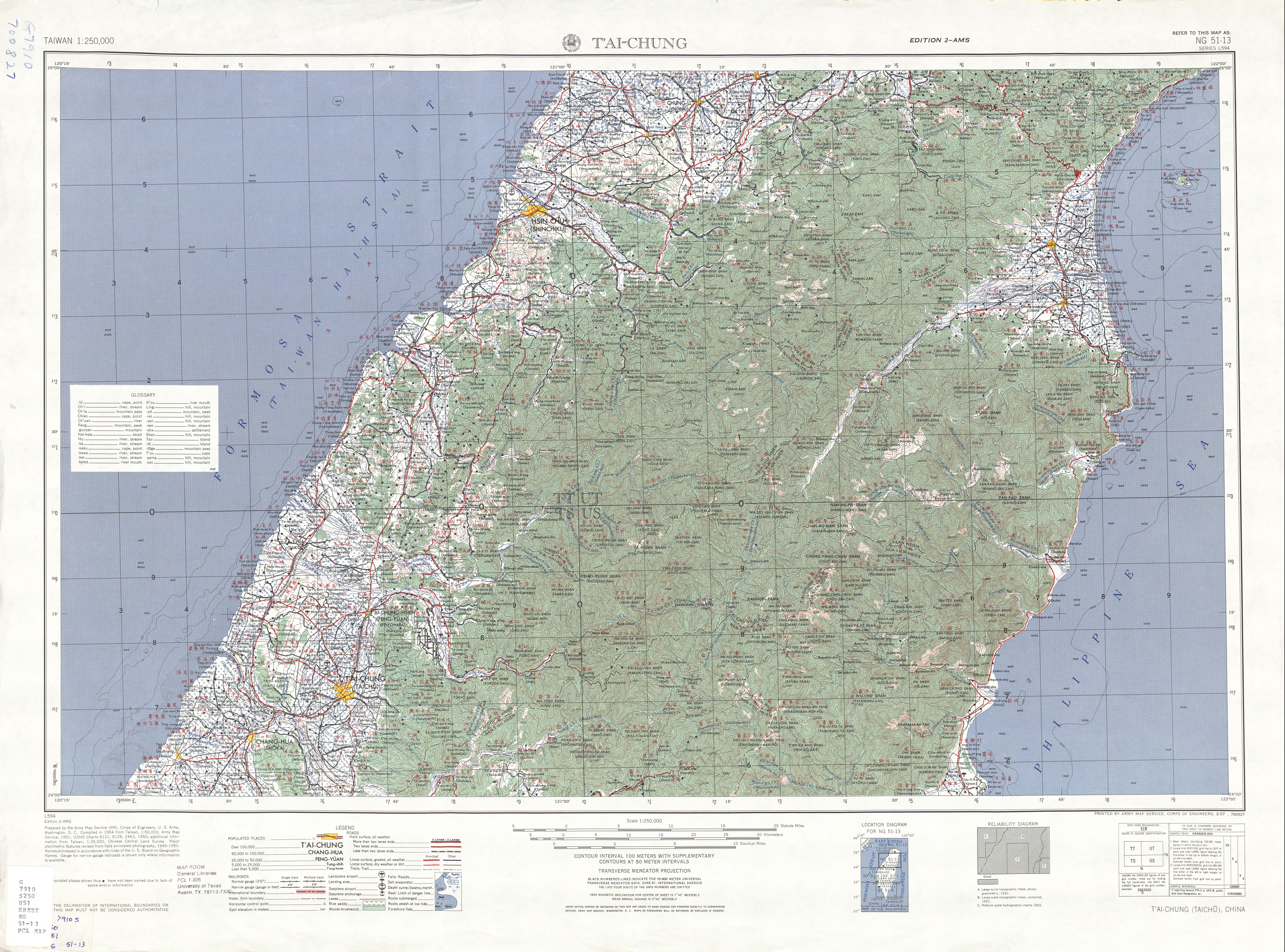
Map of the region including Yilan (labeled as I-lan (Giran) 宜蘭) (1954).

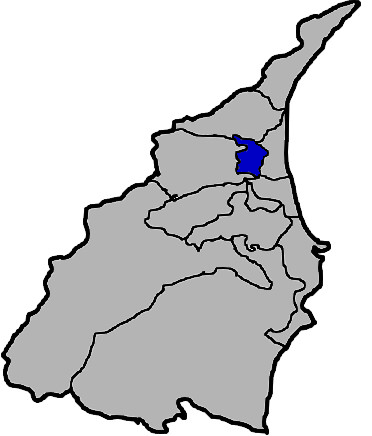
Map of Yilan City in Yilan County

The Yilan Plain in which the city is located has historically been referred to as Kapalan (Chinese: 蛤仔難; Pe̍h-ōe-jī: Kap-á-lān), Kapsulan (蛤仔蘭; Kap-chú-lân; also 甲子蘭), Komalan (噶瑪蘭; Kat-má-lán), etc. These names, as well as that of Yilan itself, were given to the sites by the Kavalan tribe of Taiwanese aborigines. Later arrivals included Han Chinese settlers during the Qing dynasty in China (1802) and settlers from Okinawa during Taiwan's Japanese era (1895–1945).

=== Qing dynasty ===
In 1810 under Qing dynasty rule, a formal administration office was established at Wuwei (五圍) and "Komalan Subprefecture" (噶瑪蘭廳; Kat-má-lán Thiaⁿ) was at the present day location of Yilan City. Construction of the city wall was completed a year later. After a few years once the basic infrastructure was ready, the city assumed the political, economical, cultural and educational center for the Lanyang Plain. In 1878, Komalan was a large rice production area commonly called Kapsulan, and became a district called Gilan Hsien. It was one of the three new districts that constituted the new Taipeh Prefecture.

=== Empire of Japan ===
According to the 1904 census, the population of Giran town was about 15,000.

=== Republic of China ===
After the handover of Taiwan from Japan to the Republic of China on 25 October 1945, Yilan City was created in January 1946 as a county-administered city the county seat of the newly created Yilan County and continued to become the political, economical and cultural centers of the region.

== Geography ==
Yilan City is located on Lanyang Plain with an average altitude of 7.38 meters above sea level.

- Area: 29.87 square kilometres (11.53 sq mi)
- Population: 95,019 (September 2023)

=== Climate ===
Yilan City experiences a humid subtropical climate (Köppen: Cfa) with mild winters and hot, humid summers.

Climate data for Yilan City (1991–2020 normals, extremes 1936–present）
Month	Jan	Feb	Mar	Apr	May	Jun	Jul	Aug	Sep	Oct	Nov	Dec	Year
Record high °C (°F)	29.7 (85.5)	29.9 (85.8)	30.6 (87.1)	32.4 (90.3)	34.9 (94.8)	36.0 (96.8)	38.8 (101.8)	38.2 (100.8)	35.4 (95.7)	34.9 (94.8)	32.7 (90.9)	29.1 (84.4)	38.8 (101.8)
Mean daily maximum °C (°F)	19.7 (67.5)	20.4 (68.7)	22.7 (72.9)	25.7 (78.3)	28.5 (83.3)	31.4 (88.5)	33.2 (91.8)	32.8 (91.0)	30.6 (87.1)	27.1 (80.8)	24.2 (75.6)	20.9 (69.6)	26.4 (79.6)
Daily mean °C (°F)	16.6 (61.9)	17.1 (62.8)	19.0 (66.2)	21.9 (71.4)	24.7 (76.5)	27.3 (81.1)	28.9 (84.0)	28.6 (83.5)	26.8 (80.2)	23.8 (74.8)	21.1 (70.0)	17.9 (64.2)	22.8 (73.1)
Mean daily minimum °C (°F)	14.0 (57.2)	14.4 (57.9)	16.0 (60.8)	18.8 (65.8)	21.7 (71.1)	24.3 (75.7)	25.6 (78.1)	25.4 (77.7)	24.0 (75.2)	21.3 (70.3)	18.7 (65.7)	15.5 (59.9)	20.0 (68.0)
Record low °C (°F)	3.2 (37.8)	4.2 (39.6)	4.8 (40.6)	6.4 (43.5)	12.1 (53.8)	16.3 (61.3)	19.9 (67.8)	19.2 (66.6)	15.8 (60.4)	11.5 (52.7)	9.0 (48.2)	4.8 (40.6)	3.2 (37.8)
Average precipitation mm (inches)	155.2 (6.11)	147.0 (5.79)	115.2 (4.54)	125.5 (4.94)	222.5 (8.76)	189.6 (7.46)	140.2 (5.52)	243.4 (9.58)	409.6 (16.13)	428.1 (16.85)	335.8 (13.22)	232.2 (9.14)	2,744.3 (108.04)
Average precipitation days (≥ 0.1 mm)	17.5	15.5	16.8	15.0	17.9	14.5	8.9	11.7	15.2	18.5	19.5	18.5	189.5
Average relative humidity (%)	80.3	81.1	79.6	80.8	82.6	81.9	77.9	79.0	79.5	80.7	83.0	81.4	80.6
Mean monthly sunshine hours	68.2	70.0	93.2	97.9	115.6	155.3	235.2	213.9	151.1	92.8	72.7	63.7	1,429.6
Source: Central Weather Bureau

== Administrative divisions ==
Yilan City consists of 38 villages and 478 neighborhoods, including:

- Baili (擺厘里), Beijin (北津里), Beimen (北門里), Caiyuan (菜園里), Chenggong (成功里), Cian (慈安里), Daxin (大新里), Fuguo (負郭里), Fuxing (復興里), Jianjun (建軍里), Jianye (建業里), Jiaobai (茭白里), Jinshi (進士里), Kaixuan (凱旋里), Liming (黎明里), Meizhou (梅洲里), Minquan (民權里), Minzu (民族里), Nanjin (南津里), Nanmen (南門里), Nanqiao (南橋里), Qijie (七結里), Qizhang (七張里), Shennong (神農里), Siyuan (思源里), Taishan (泰山里), Dongcun (東村里), Dongmen/Tungmen (東門里), Wenhua (文化里), Xiaolian (孝廉里), Xiaodong (小東里), Ximen (西門里), Xinmin (新民里), Xinsheng (新生里), Xindong (新東里), Yanping (延平里), Zhongshan (中山里) and Zhongxing (中興里)

== Government institutions ==
- Yilan County Government
- Yilan County Council
- Institute of Yilan County History

== Tourist attractions ==
- Former Yilan Prison
- Memorial Hall of Founding of Yilan Administration
- Yilan Brick Kiln
- Yilan Confucian Temple
- Yilan Distillery Chia Chi Lan Wine Museum
- Yilan Literary Museum
- Yilan Museum of Art

== Transportation ==
Yilan City is accessible by Yilan Station of Taiwan Railway.

== Sister cities ==
- Leawood, Kansas, United States (1988)
- Madera, California, United States (1994)
- Rockville, Maryland, United States (2019)

Yilan City became a sister city of Rockville, Maryland, in 2019. The relationship gained notoriety as diplomats from the Embassy of China, Washington, D.C., unsuccessfully attempted to scuttle the agreement.

== Bibliography ==
- Takekoshi, Yosaburō (1907). Japanese rule in Formosa. London, New York, Bombay and Calcutta: Longmans, Green, and co. OCLC 753129. OL 6986981M.
