= Yilan railway station =

Railway station in Taiwan

Yilan Station 宜蘭車站
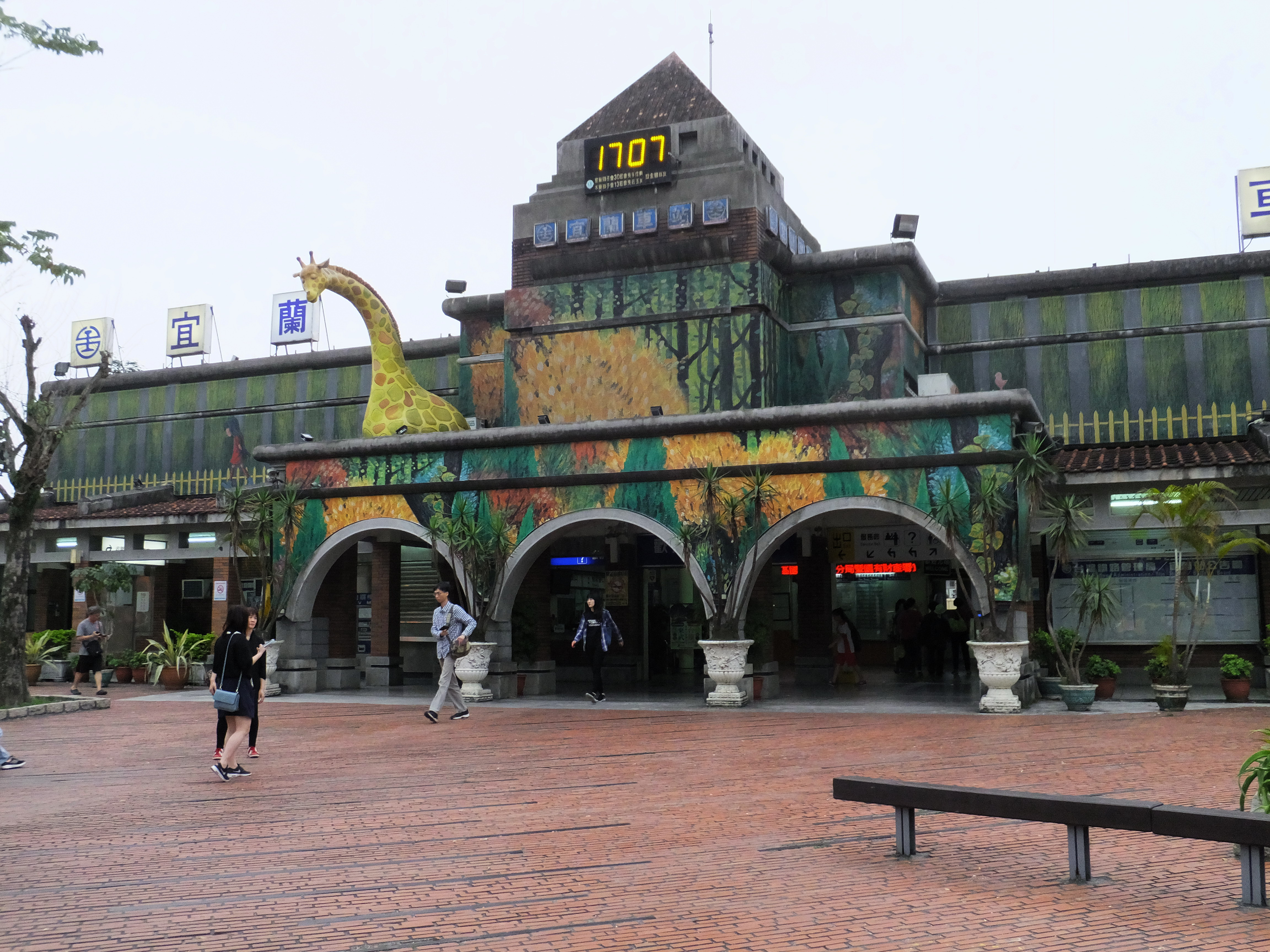

General information
- Location: Yilan City, Yilan County, Taiwan
- Coordinates: 24°45′16.56″N 121°45′29.28″E
- System: Train station
- Owner: Taiwan Railways Administration
- Operator: Taiwan Railways Administration
- Line: Eastern Trunk line
- Platforms: Island and side
- Train operators: Taiwan Railways Administration

History
- Opened: 24 March 1919; 107 years ago

Passengers
- 7,974 daily (2024)

Services
Preceding station	Taiwan Railway	Following station
Sicheng towards Badu	Eastern Trunk line	Erjie towards Taitung
Location

Yilan (Chinese: 宜蘭車站; pinyin: Yilán Chēzhàn) is a railway station of Yilan line of the Taiwan Railways Administration located at Yilan City, Yilan County, Taiwan.

== History ==
The station was opened on 24 March 1919.

== Structure ==
There is one island platform and one side platform.

== See also ==
- List of railway stations in Taiwan
