= Chen Nan-kuang =

Economist from Taiwan

- 陳南光

Deputy Governor of the Central Bank of the Republic of China
- Incumbent
- Assumed office March 2018 Serving with Yen Tzung-ta
- Governor: Yang Chin-long

Personal details
- Born: October 1964 (age 61)
- Education: National Taiwan University (BA, MA); University of Minnesota (PhD)

Chen Nan-kuang (Chinese: 陳南光; pinyin: Chén Nánguāng) is a Taiwanese economist and academic. He became the Deputy Governor of the Central Bank of the Republic of China in March 2018.

== Education ==
Chen graduated from National Taiwan University with a bachelor's degree in economics in 1987 and a master's degree in economics in 1989. He then completed doctoral studies in the United States, earning his Ph.D. in economics from the University of Minnesota in 1997. His doctoral dissertation, completed under Japanese economist Nobuhiro Kiyotaki, was titled, "Studies on bank capital, assets markets and economic activity".

== Early careers ==
Chen was the assistant professor of the department of economics of NTU from August 1997 until July 2003. In August 2003 until July 2008, he was an associate professor within the same department of the university, and finally he became a professor of the department in August 2008, which continued until March 2018, when he left that position for the Central Bank of the Republic of China in Taiwan.
