= Yen Tzung-ta =

Taiwanese economist (born 1956)

- 嚴宗大

Deputy Governor of the Central Bank of the Republic of China
- Incumbent
- Assumed office February 2012 Serving with Chen Nan-kuang
- Governor: Perng Fai-nan; Yang Chin-long

Personal details
- Born: January 1956 (age 70)
- Education: Tunghai University (BA); National Chengchi University (MA); Michigan State University (PhD)

Yen Tzung-ta (Chinese: 嚴宗大; pinyin: Yán Zōngdà) is a Taiwanese economist and the current Deputy Governor of the Central Bank of the Republic of China since February 2012.

== Education ==
Yen graduated from Tunghai University with a bachelor's degree in economics in 1978 and earned a master's degree in economics from National Chengchi University in 1980. He then completed doctoral studies in the United States, earning his Ph.D. in economics from Michigan State University in 1989. His doctoral dissertation was titled, "Studies in currency substitution and exchange rate determination: the case of South Korea and Taiwan".

== Early careers ==
Yen was the assistant director-general of the department of economic research off the Central Bank of the Republic of China in April 1993 until January 2004. He then became the adviser of the Central Bank in January 2004 until October 2006. In October 2006 until March 2008, he became the deputy director-general of the department of economic research of the Central Bank. Lastly, he became the director-general of the department of economic research of the Central Bank in March 2008 until February 2012.
