= China Airlines Flight 676 =

1998 aviation accident in Taiwan

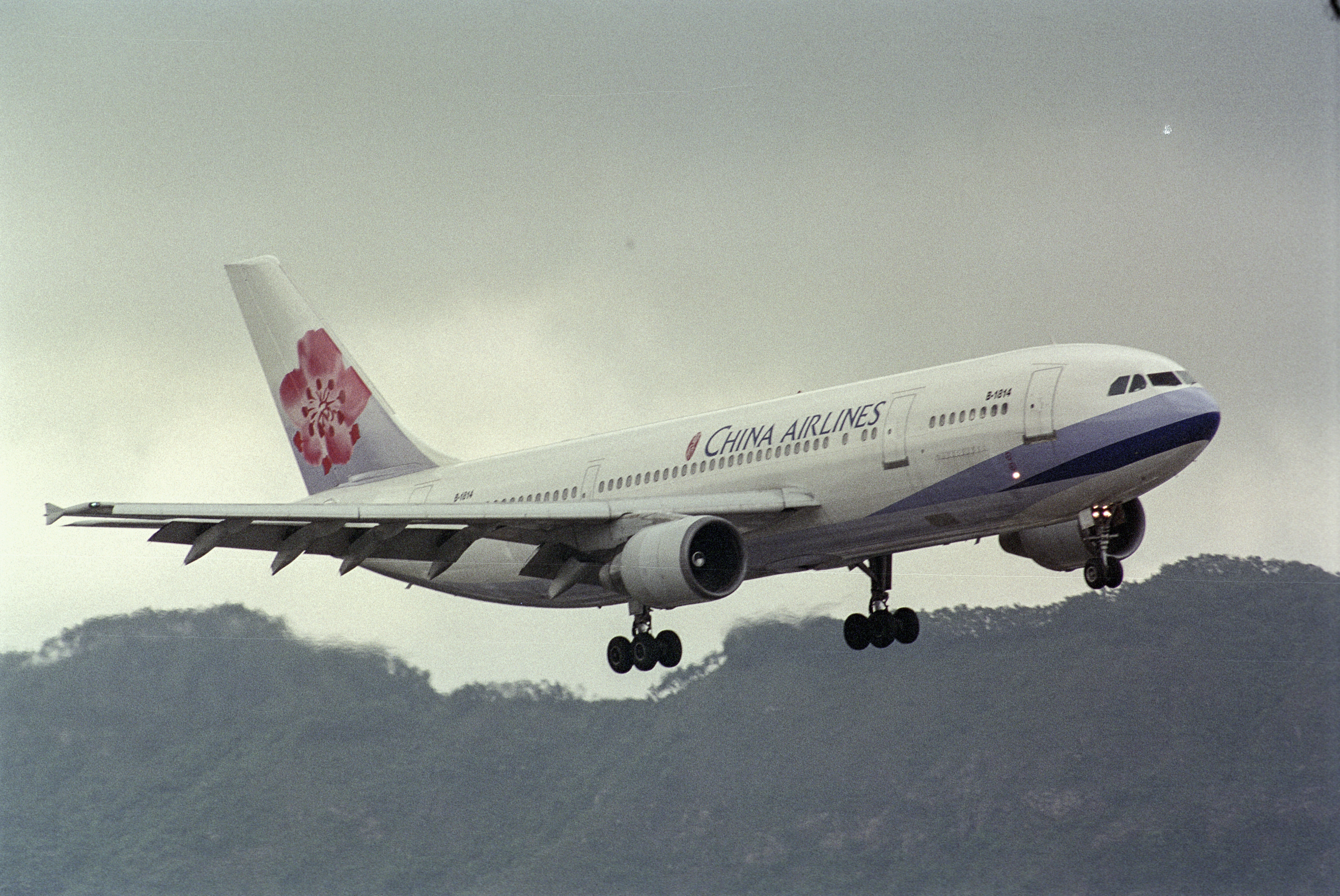
- B-1814, the aircraft involved in the accident, in May 1997

Accident
- Date: 16 February 1998
- Summary: Stalled and crashed while performing a go around caused by pilot error
- Site: Chiang Kai-shek International Airport (Short of airport), Taoyuan, Taiwan; 25.089512°N 121.228268°E
- Total fatalities: 203
- Total survivors: 0

Aircraft
- Aircraft type: Airbus A300B4-622R
- Operator: China Airlines
- IATA flight No.: CI676
- ICAO flight No.: CAL676
- Call sign: DYNASTY 676
- Registration: B-1814
- Flight origin: Ngurah Rai International Airport, Bali, Indonesia
- Destination: Chiang Kai-shek International Airport, Taoyuan, Taiwan
- Occupants: 196
- Passengers: 182
- Crew: 14
- Fatalities: 196
- Survivors: 0

Ground casualties
- Ground fatalities: 7

China Airlines Flight 676 was a scheduled international passenger flight. On 16 February 1998, the Airbus A300 jet airliner operating the flight crashed into a road and residential area in Tayuan, Taoyuan County (now Taoyuan City), near Chiang Kai-shek International Airport (now Taoyuan International Airport), Taiwan.

The Airbus A300 was en route from Ngurah Rai Airport in Bali, Indonesia, to Taipei, Taiwan. The weather was inclement, with rain and fog, when the aircraft approached Chiang Kai-shek International Airport, so the pilot executed a missed approach. After the jet was cleared to land at runway 05L, the autopilot was disengaged, and the pilots then attempted a manual go-around. The jet slowed, pitched up by 40°, rose 1,000 feet (300 m), stalled, and crashed into a residential neighbourhood, bursting into flames. All 196 people on board were killed (including the governor of Taiwan's central bank, Sheu Yuan-dong, his wife, and three central bank officials), along with six people on the ground. Hsu Lu, the manager of the Voice of Taipei radio station, said that one boy was pulled alive from the wreckage and later died.

== Background ==
=== Aircraft ===
The aircraft involved was an Airbus A300B4-622R, registered as B-1814. It was delivered to China Airlines on 14 December 1990 and was powered by two Pratt and Whitney PW4156 engines. The aircraft's serial number was 578 and it first flew on 16 October 1990. It was 7.3 years old at the time of the accident and had completed 20,193 flight hours.

=== Crew ===
In command was Captain Kang Long-lin (康龍麟), aged 49, who had joined China Airlines in 1990, and had logged 7,226 hours total flight time, 2,382 of which were logged on the Airbus A300. First Officer Jiang Der-sheng (姜德生), aged 44, had joined China Airlines in 1996, and had 3,550 hours total flight time, including 304 on the Airbus A300. Both pilots were formerly with the Republic of China Air Force. The flight consisted of 175 Taiwanese nationals, 5 Americans, 1 French, and 1 Indonesian.

Nationality	Passengers	Crew	Ground	Total
Taiwan	175	14	6	195
United States	5	0	0	5
France	1	0	0	1
Indonesia	1	0	0	1
Total	182	14	6	202

== Accident ==
The plane took off from Ngurah Rai International Airport, Bali, en route to Chiang Kai-shek International Airport, Taipei, Taiwan, with 182 passengers and 14 crew at 15:27.

The Airbus carried out an instrument landing system/distance-measuring equipment (ILS/DME) approach to runway 05L at Taipei Chiang Kai-shek Airport in light rain and fog, but came in 1,000 feet (300 m) too high above the glide slope (at 1,515 feet (462 m) and 1.2 nautical miles (1.4 mi; 2.2 km) short of the runway threshold). Go-around power was applied 19 seconds later, and the landing gear was raised and the flaps set to 20° as the aircraft climbed through 1,700 feet (520 m) in a 35° pitch-up angle.

Reaching 2,751 feet (839 m) (42.7° pitch-up, 45 knots (52 mph; 83 km/h) speed), the A300 stalled. Control could not be regained, as the aircraft fell and smashed into the ground 200 feet (61 m) left of the runway. It then surged forward, hit a utility pole and a median strip of Provincial Highway 15 and skidded into several houses, surrounded by fish farms, rice paddies, factories, and warehouses, and exploded, killing all on board and 6 people on the ground.

Weather was 2,400 feet (730 m) visibility, runway visual range runway 05L of 3,900 feet (1,200 m), 300 feet (91 m) broken ceiling, 3,000 feet (910 m) overcast. According to the cockpit voice recorder, the last words, from the first officer, were "Pull it up, too low!" This was surrounded by the terrain alarm and stall warnings.

== Investigation and conclusion ==
On initial approach to land, the aircraft was more than 300 m above its normal altitude when it was only 6 nautical miles away from the airport. Nonetheless, it continued the approach. Only when approaching the runway threshold was a go-around initiated. During this time, the pilot had pushed the yoke forward and the plane's autopilot was disengaged, but he was not aware of it, so during the go-around, he did nothing to actively take control of the plane, as he thought the autopilot would initiate the maneuver. For 11 seconds, the plane was under no one's control.

Following a formal investigation that had continued for nearly 2 years, a final report by a special task force under the Civil Aviation Administration concluded that pilot error was the cause of the crash of Flight 676. The report concludes by criticizing China Airlines for "insufficient training" and "poor management of the resources in the pilot's cabin".

== In popular culture ==
The crash of China Airlines Flight 676 was featured in the 2024 episode "Eleven Deadly Seconds", of the Canadian-made, internationally distributed documentary series Mayday.

== See also ==
- China Airlines Flight 140, another crash involving an Airbus A300 during the 1990s, which also stalled and crashed on final approach.
- Flydubai Flight 981
- 2021 Piedade de Caratinga Beechcraft King Air crash
