= Liang Kuo-shu =

Taiwanese economist (1930–1995)

- 梁國樹

Governor of the Central Bank of the Republic of China
- In office 1 June 1994 – 20 March 1995
- President: Lee Teng-hui
- Preceded by: Hsieh Sam-chung
- Succeeded by: Sheu Yuan-dong

Personal details
- Born: 12 December 1930 Taichū Prefecture, Taiwan, Empire of Japan
- Died: 31 July 1995 (aged 64) Taipei, Taiwan
- Spouse: Hou Jinying
- Education: National Taiwan University (BA, MA); Vanderbilt University (PhD)

Liang Kuo-shu (12 December 1930 – 31 July 1995) was a Taiwanese economist who became the first native Taiwanese to serve as the Governor of the Central Bank of the Republic of China.

== Biography ==
Liang was born in Taichū Prefecture on 12 December 1930 to a wealthy clan in Xiushui, Chuanghua. Liang graduated from National Taiwan University with a bachelor's degree in economics and a master's degree in economics. He then pursued postgraduate studies at the Vanderbilt University in the United States, earning his Ph.D. in economics in 1970. His doctoral dissertation, on "Foreign Trade and Economic Development in Taiwan: 1952-1967", was completed under economist Werner Baer's supervision.

He became a professor at the National Taiwan University (NTU), before entering the banking sector. Starting from August 1975, Liang was the chairman of various government-owned banks for 19 years (including First Bank, Changhua Bank, Chiao Tung Bank), until he succeeded Hsieh Sam-chung to become the 14th governor of the Central Bank. However, he resigned after less than a year in office on health grounds, and died four months later on 31 July 1995 aged 64. A lecture hall in the NTU was named after Liang to commenmorate his contributions.

== Personal life ==
Liang married Hou Jin-ying, daughter of industrialist and Tainan Gang tycoon Hou Yu-li. She worked in the banking department of National Chengchi University and is the chairperson of the Far East Intercontinental Bank.

Preceded by Hsieh Sam-chung	Governor of the Central Bank of the Republic of China; 1 June 1994 – 20 March 1995	Succeeded by Sheu Yuan-dong
