= Central Bank of China (disambiguation) =

Central Bank of China may refer to:

- People's Bank of China, the Central Bank of the People's Republic of China
- Central Bank of the Republic of China (Taiwan)

== See also ==
- Bank of China, state-owned commercial bank in China
