= Chinese customs =

Chinese customs may refer to:

- The agencies taxed with collecting tariffs and other fees on goods imported to or exported from China, particularly:
  - General Administration of Customs
  - Chinese Maritime Customs Service
  - Chinese customs gold unit
- The agency responsible for controlling its borders
  - China Immigration Inspection
- Various features of Chinese culture, including:
  - Chinese pre-wedding customs
