= Sheu Yuan-dong =

Taiwanese politician (born 1927, died 1998)

- 許遠東
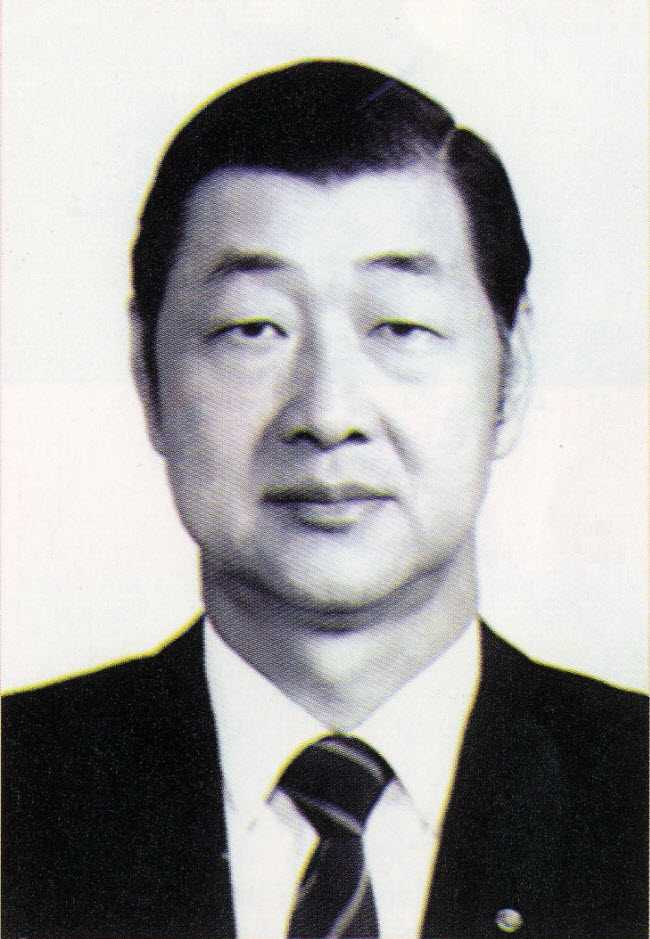

Governor of the Central Bank of the Republic of China
- In office 20 March 1995 – 16 February 1998
- Preceded by: Liang Kuo-shu
- Succeeded by: Perng Fai-nan

Personal details
- Born: 22 May 1927 Shinchiku, Shinchiku Prefecture, Japanese Taiwan
- Died: 16 February 1998 (aged 70) Chiang Kai-Shek Int'l Airport, Taoyuan County (now Taoyuan City), Taiwan
- Spouse: Huang Mian-mei
- Children: Sheu Chiu-chen
- Education: National Taiwan University (BA)

Sheu Yuan-dong (traditional Chinese: 許遠東; 22 May 1927 – 16 February 1998) was a Taiwanese politician who was the 15th governor of Taiwan's central bank from 1995 until his death in 1998. Born in then-Japanese-occupied Taiwan, Sheu attended Taipei City Success High School and graduated from the Department of Political Science at the National Taiwan University. He held senior positions in Taiwan's financial sector. On 16 February 1998, he was killed in the crash of China Airlines Flight 676 along with his wife, Huang Mian-mei, and three other officials of the central bank.

== Life and career ==
Sheu Yuan-dong was born on 22 May 1927 in Shinchiku Prefecture. Four months after his birth, he and his family moved to Taipei to make a living. In 1935, he attended Longshang public School No. In 1941, he attended the Taipei State Second Middle School. In October 1945, he was admitted to the National Taiwan University. In October 1946 he enrolled in the Political Department of the Taiwan University Law School. In January 1947, in response to the Shen Chong case, students from Taiwan University and Peking University held anti-American demonstrations in Taipei, which Sheu participated in. After the outbreak of the February 28 incident the same year, the Secrecy Bureau arrested college students and intellectuals, while Sheu took refuge in Yilan City and Yingge District. Sheu attended the reading club during the political department of the National Taiwan University. He was involved in the Keelung City Work Committee case and was arrested by the Secrecy Bureau on the night of 2 September 1949. In May 1950, he was sent to the freshman corps in present-day Neihu District and was released in March 1951. In October of the same year, Sheu was re-educated at Taiwan University and graduated in June 1952.

In 1954, Sheu, future Taiwanese president Lee Teng-hui, future member of the Judicial Yuan Hung Hsun-hsin, future writer and businessman Chiu Yung-han, and other Taiwanese elites were hired to teach at the Taipei Private Yan Ping High School.

Sheu entered the Taiwan Provincial Cooperation Treasury Hualien Branch in 1953 as a clerk. In 1954, he was a clerk in the Research Office of the Cooperative Treasury Head Office. In 1959, he was the Planning Director of the Cooperative Treasury Savings Department. In 1968, he was the assistant manager of the treasury and the Ministry of Agriculture and Credit. In 1974, he cooperated. Deputy General Manager of Jinku, the general manager of the Land Bank in 1979 and the general manager of the First Bank in 1980. In 1982, he was the Finance Director of the Ministry of Finance. In 1984, he was Chairman of the Land Bank. In 1989, he was Chairman of the Banking Association. In January 1990, he was a member of the Central Bank and became Chairman of the Bank of Taiwan in July 1995.

Sheu became the governor of the Central Bank of the Republic of China on 20 March 1995, succeeding Liang Kuo-shu, who resigned due to health problems and died later the same year. The 1997 Asian financial crisis affected many Asian countries, but did not seriously affect Taiwan. The financial community believed that it was the president's operator.

== Death ==
In February 1998, Sheu, Chen Huang and other senior officials of the central bank's foreign exchange bureau flew to Bali, Indonesia to attend the annual meeting of the Presidents Association of the Central Bank of Southeast Asia. After the end of conference on February 16, they boarded China Airlines Flight 676 for their return trip to Chiang Kai-shek International Airport. The Airbus A300-600 crashed during final approach due to pilot error, killing all 196 people on board including Sheu, as well as six people on the ground. Lee Teng-hui, the president of Taiwan at the time, instructed Perng Fai-nan to take over as governor of the central bank.

During Sheu Yuan-dong's tenure as governor of the central bank, Paul Chiu was the vice president of the central bank.

== Legacy ==
On 16 February 2008, the tenth anniversary of Sheu Yuan-dong's death, many Taiwanese financial leaders invited the Alban Berg Quartet, who had a good relationship with Sheu, to Taiwan. A remembrance concert was held for Sheu on 14 May 2008.

== Biographical publishing ==
On 3 October 2010, Sheu Yuan-dong's biography was published. It was written by Sheu's daughter Sheu Chiu-chen and senior journalist Lu Shih-hsiang. The book reveals his resentment of a "foreign regime" and his belief in Taiwanese independence, saying:

Why are Taiwanese destined to live under the rule of "foreign regime?" Can this be a colonial life? Is this Taiwan? Is it true that I will not accept this sentence? Taiwanese people have strengthened their conscious ability day by day. One day, [when] the time is ripe, and I believe that without a bloodshed, Taiwan must establish a completely independent democracy.

— Sheu Yuan-dong

In addition, Sheu also criticized Vincent Siew, the then-president of the Executive Yuan, for his handling of the 1997 Asian financial crisis. He also expressed concern when finance minister Wang Chien-shien opened a private bank in 1990.

Preceded by Liang Kuo-shu	Governor of the Central Bank of the Republic of China; 20 March 1995 – 16 February 1998	Succeeded by Perng Fai-nan
