= Perng Fai-nan =

Taiwanese politician and economist

- 彭淮南
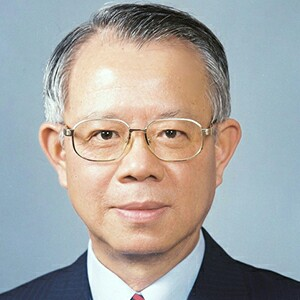

16th Governor of the Central Bank
- In office 25 February 1998 – 26 February 2018
- President: Lee Teng-hui; Chen Shui-bian; Ma Ying-jeou; Tsai Ing-wen
- Deputy: Yang Chin-long; Yen Tzung-ta
- Preceded by: Sheu Yuan-dong
- Succeeded by: Yang Chin-long

Personal details
- Born: 2 January 1939 (age 87) Shinchiku Prefecture, Taiwan
- Party: Kuomintang
- Education: National Chung Hsing University (BA); University of Minnesota (MA)

Perng Fai-nan (Chinese: 彭淮南; pinyin: Péng Huáinán; born 2 January 1939) is a Taiwanese economist. He served as the governor of the Central Bank of the Republic of China (Taiwan) from 25 February 1998 to 26 February 2018, the longest-serving governor in the bank's history. Perng held the distinction as "Best Central Banker in the world" for 14 years (2000, 2005-2017) per Global Finance.

== Education ==
Perng obtained his bachelor's degree in economics from College of Law and Business, National Chung Hsing University (now National Taipei University) in 1962. He then obtained his master's degree in economics from University of Minnesota in the United States in 1971.

== Career ==
Perng was trained as an economist and by 2000 had become a prominent banker. He has been listed in the Global Finance magazine "world's top bankers" for eight consecutive years and has also been credited with saving the banking sector in Taiwan through two near-disastrous financial crises.

His career reached its apex when he was highly regarded as a prime candidate for the premiership of Taiwan, and during President Ma Ying-jeou's government, considered for the position of the cabinet head. Perng, however, declined to continue working in the banking world. Perng reputedly works 364 days a year, taking just one day off for the Chinese New Year's Eve.

As a governor of the central bank, Perng's role is to keep a balance between Taiwan's export and foreign exchange flexibility on one hand and foster economic growth and check domestic inflation.

Perng is well regarded in business circles in Taiwan and in his fourteen years with Taiwan' Central Bank reportedly had steered the bank into becoming a "hen that lays golden eggs". His presence at the bank was widely regarded as a sign of currency stability in Taiwan.
