= Hsieh Sam-chung =

Taiwanese economist

- 謝森中

Governor of the Central Bank of the Republic of China
- In office 1 June 1989 – 31 May 1994
- President: Lee Teng-hui
- Preceded by: Chang Chi-cheng
- Succeeded by: Liang Kuo-shu

Personal details
- Born: 13 November 1919 Mei County, Guangdong
- Died: 24 April 2004 (aged 84) Los Angeles, California, U.S.
- Spouse: Xie Yanxi
- Education: National Central University (BA, MA); University of Minnesota (PhD)

Hsieh Sam-chung (Chinese: 謝森中; pinyin: Xiè Sēnzhōng; 13 November 1919 – 24 April 2004) was a Taiwanese economist who served as the 13th Governor of the Central Bank of the Republic of China.

== Biography ==
Hsieh was born in Mei County of Guangdong, to a Hakka Chinese family. He earned a bachelor's degree and a master's degree in agricultural economics from National Central University in Nanking. He completed doctoral studies in the United States, earning his Ph.D. in agricultural economics from the University of Minnesota in 1957. His doctoral dissertation was "Rice and sugarcane competition on paddy land in Central Taiwan". He was once a professor at Department of Agricultural Economics of National Taiwan University (from 1950 to 1960) and visiting professor at the University of the Philippines.

He served in the Department of Agriculture in Taiwan from 1951 until his resignation in 1965 to become a founding director of the Asian Development Bank (ADB), which was headquartered in the Philippines. At the ADB, he helped advance the Green Revolution. After returning to Taiwan, he held various positions, including as a member of Council for Economic Planning and Development in 1981. After serving in the chairmanships of Chiao Tung Bank and Industrial Bank of Taiwan, he became the president of the Central Bank of the Republic of China in 1989. He served in various advisory capacity after stepping down from the governorship in 1994, such as advisor for CTBC Bank and Central Bank, and as presidential advisor.

Hsieh died in 2004 in the United States. His family endowed the Dr. Sam-Chung Hsieh Memorial Lecture series at Stanford University, and donated his personal archive to Stanford University Libraries' Special Collections.

Preceded by Chang Chi-cheng	Governor of the Central Bank of the Republic of China; 1 June 1989 – 31 May 1994	Succeeded by Liang Kuo-shu
