= Yang Chin-long =

Economist from Taiwan

- 楊金龍
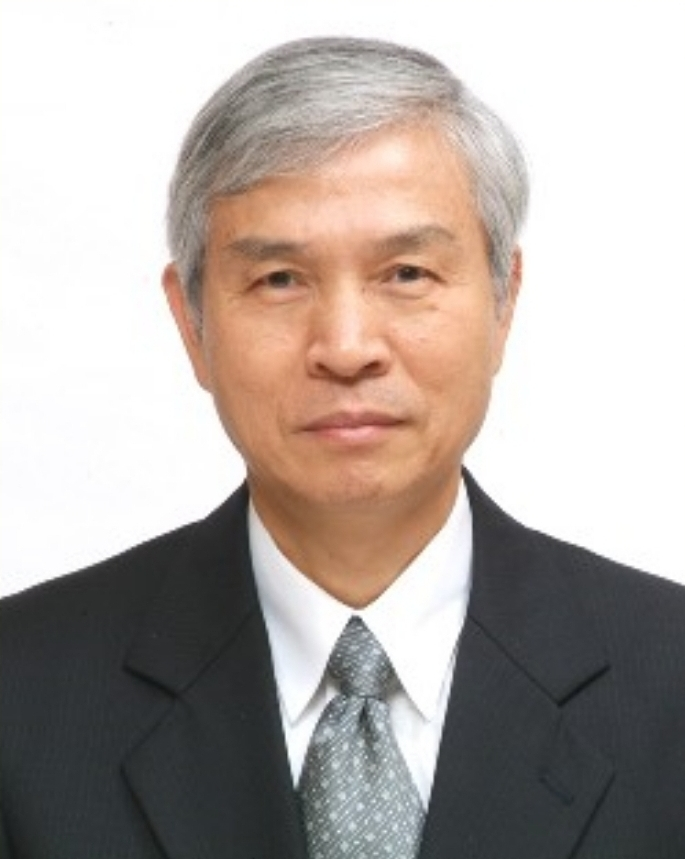

17th Governor of the Central Bank
- Incumbent
- Assumed office 26 February 2018
- President: Tsai Ing-wen; Lai Ching-te
- Deputy: Chen Nan-kuang; Yen Tzung-ta
- Preceded by: Perng Fai-nan

Personal details
- Born: 5 June 1953 (age 73) Pingtung County, Taiwan
- Party: Independent
- Education: National Chengchi University (BA, MA); University of Birmingham (PhD)

Yang Chin-long (Chinese: 楊金龍; pinyin: Yáng Jīnlóng; born 5 June 1953) is a Taiwanese economist who has served as the governor of the Central Bank of Taiwan since 2018.

== Early life and education ==
Yang was born in Pingtung County, Taiwan, on June 5, 1953. His parents were farmers. As a child, he was a pitcher for a local Little League Baseball chapter.

After high school, Yang graduated from National Chengchi University with a bachelor's degree in banking in 1976 and a master's degree in international trade in 1980. After graduation, he completed military service in the Republic of China Marine Corps. He then won a scholarship provided by the Ministry of Education to complete doctoral studies in England, where he earned his Ph.D. in economics from the University of Birmingham in 1989.

== Career ==
After receiving his doctorate, Yang began working for the Central Bank of the Republic of China (Taiwan). Yang was named deputy governor of Taiwan's central bank in 2008. After Perng Fai-nan announced that he would retire upon the conclusion of his fifth term, Yang, Shea Jia-dong, and Richard Koo were considered candidates to succeed him. On 1 February, Yang was appointed as the new Central Bank governor.

Yang was listed in the Central Banker Report Card 2019, a list of the top central bankers compiled by Global Finance. In his first appearance on the list, he was given an A-grade.
