= Farmers Bank of China =

Former bank in Mainland China from 1933–1949 and Taiwan from 1967–2006

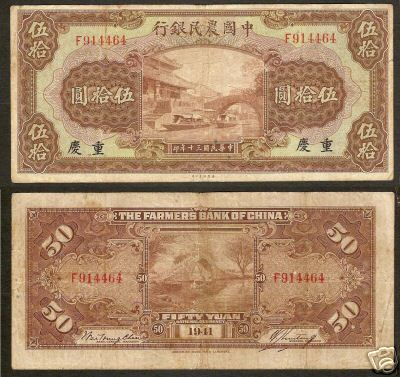
- A 1941 banknote issued by the Farmers Bank of China
- Type: Joint stock company
- Industry: Banking
- Founded: April 1, 1933; in Hankou (present day Wuhan, Hubei); May 20, 1967; in Taipei, Taiwan Province
- Defunct: October 1, 1949 (Mainland China); May 1, 2006 (Taiwan)
- Fate: Mainland assets incorporated into the People's Bank of China, remnants acquired by Taiwan Cooperative Bank in 2006
- Successor: People's Bank of China; Taiwan Cooperative Bank
- Headquarters: 85 Nanjing East Road, Section 2, Taipei, Taiwan, R.O.C.
- Key people: Chen Zhong, Chairman
- Products: Financial services
- Revenue: ▲USD 430 million (2005)
- Total assets: ▲USD 18.23 billion (2005)
- Number of employees: 2,339 (2005)
- Website: www.farmerbank.com.tw

Farmers Bank of China
- Traditional Chinese: 中國農民銀行
- Simplified Chinese: 中国农民银行
Transcriptions
Standard Mandarin
- Hanyu Pinyin: Zhōngguó nóngmín yínháng

The Farmers Bank of China was a major bank in China, one of the "big four" banks of issue in the 1930s together with the Bank of China, Bank of Communications, and Central Bank of China.

== Overview ==
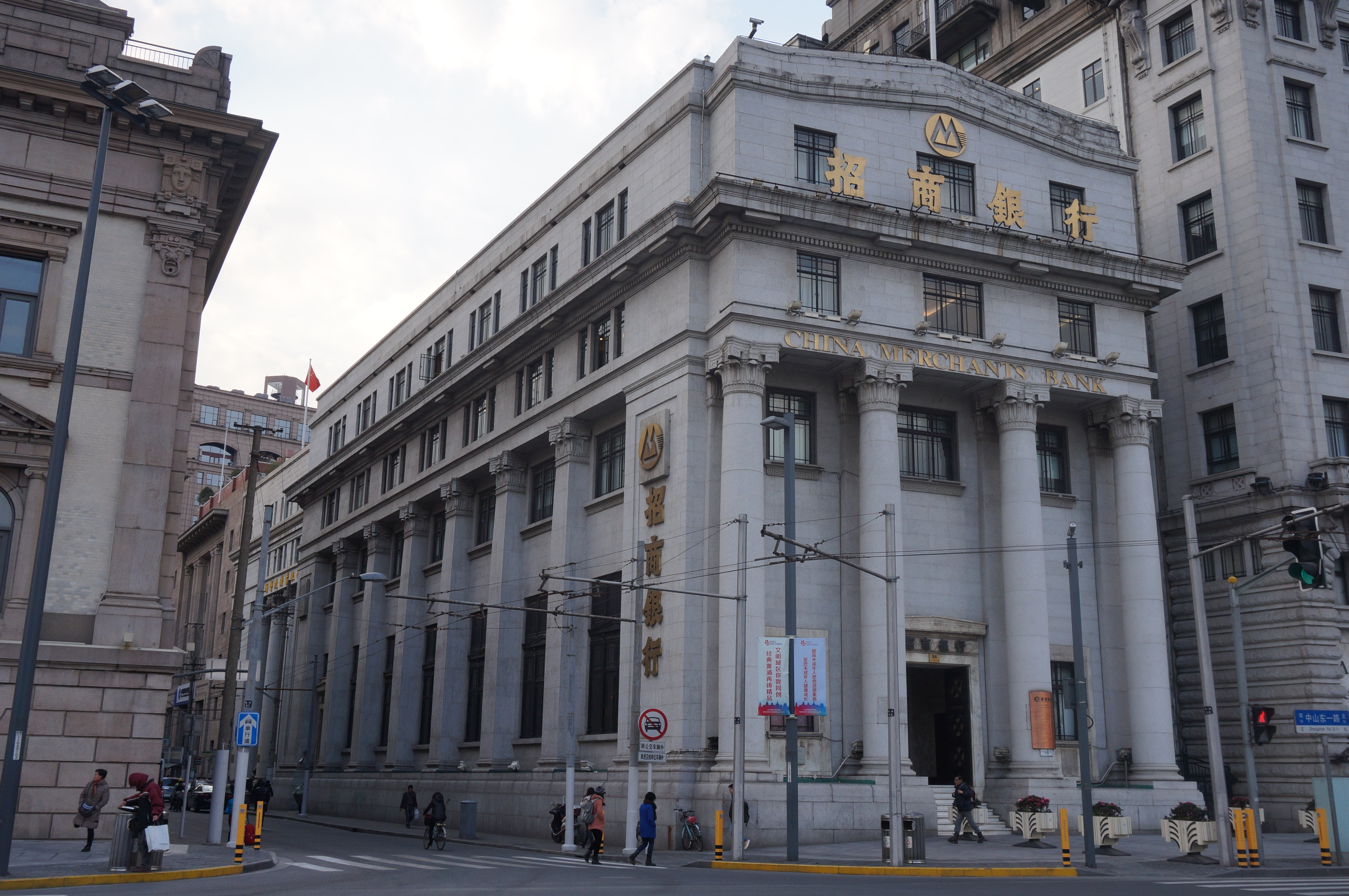
The Bank of Taiwan Building on the Bund served as Shanghai headquarters for the Farmers Bank of China between 1945 and 1949

The Farmers Bank was founded on 1 April 1933 in Hankou (modern day Wuhan) from the amalgamation of provincial agricultural banks in Henan, Hubei, Anhui and Jiangxi. Governed by the Farmers Bank of China Law, the bank was established to stimulate agricultural development by providing lines of credit to farmers and rural landowners. The loans were intended for use to purchase equipment and crops. The bank was initially under majority government ownership.

The bank became one of the four major banks of the Nationalist era of China. Along with the Central Bank of China (currently the Central Bank of the Republic of China), Bank of China and Bank of Communications, the Farmers Bank of China was allowed to issue its own banknotes until late July 1942, when it lost its note-issuance privilege whereas the Central Bank of China was granted the issuance monopoly in the territories still ruled by the Nationalist government.

The bank was relocated to Chongqing in 1937, along with Kuomintang-led Nationalist Government during Second Sino-Japanese War and relocated to the former Japanese colony of Taiwan in 1949 because of the Chinese Civil War. However, it was not until May 20, 1967 that the bank resumed operations after relocating to Taiwan.

The Government of the People's Republic of China incorporated the bank's assets in Mainland China into the People's Bank of China, but later transferred these to the Agricultural Bank of China.

From 1967 until 2006, the bank opened and operated 107 branches throughout Taiwan. It also operated overseas offices in Los Angeles and Seattle.

The Taiwanese government undertook a reform of the banking industry in 1992 with the listing of state-owned banks on the stock exchange. The Farmers Bank of China was partially privatized in 1994, and all government shares were put on the market in 1999. Accordingly, the Farmers Bank of China Law was repealed by Legislative Yuan in 2005 to complete full privatization of the bank.

The bank was the 14th largest lender in Taiwan until the bank was acquired by the Taiwan Cooperative Bank (合作金庫銀行) on May 1, 2006.

== Former Chairmen ==
- Xie Dongmin (謝東閔) 1947-1952
- Li Lianchun (李連春) 1952-1972
- Hong Qiaorong (洪樵榕) 1972-1978
- Ye Xinming (葉新明) 1978-1981
- Zhang Xunshun (張訓舜) 1981-1988
- Xu Minhui (許敏惠) 1988-1991
- Luo Jitang (羅際棠) 1991-1994
- Bu Zhengming (卜正明) Feb 1994 - Nov 1994
- Liao Hebi (廖和璧) 1994-1996
- Li Wenxiong (李文雄) 1996-2001
- Liang Chengjin (梁成金) 2001-2004
- Chen Zhong (陳沖) 2004-2006
