= Werner Baer =

German-American economist (1931–2016)

- Born: December 13, 1931; Offenbach, Germany
- Died: March 31, 2016 (aged 84); Urbana, Illinois, U.S.

Academic background
- Education: Queens College (BA); Harvard University (MA, PhD)

Academic work
- Discipline: Development economics
- Institutions: University of Illinois Urbana-Champaign
- Doctoral students: Liang Kuo-shu

Werner Baer (May 6, 1931 – March 31, 2016) was an American economist. He was the Jorge Lemann Professor of Economics at the University of Illinois Urbana-Champaign.

== Early life ==
Baer received his bachelor's degree from CUNY Queens College in 1953, and a Master's and a Ph.D. from Harvard University in 1955 and 1958 respectively.

== Academic career ==
His research centered on Latin America's industrialization and economic development, especially of Import Substitution Industrialization (ISI) and Brazil.

Baer's research and writing focused primarily on the areas of industrialization, growth and economic development, public policy, inflation, and income distribution and equity.

He has written such books as Industrialization and Economic Development in Brazil (1965), The Development of the Brazilian Steel Industry (1970) The Brazilian Economy: Its Growth and Development (1979), now in its sixth edition, as well as articles on a diverse range of economic and policy issues.

He served on the editorial boards of the Luso-Brazilian Review, Emerging Markets Review, Economia Aplicada, Latin American Business Review, Revista Latinoamericana de Historica Economica y Social, Revista Paraguaya de Estudios Sociologicos, Latin American Research Review, and World Development.

He taught at Yale (1961–65), Vanderbilt (1965–74), and the University of Illinois (1974–2016), and he served as a program advisor for the Ford Foundation in Rio de Janeiro from 1967 to 1976. He encouraged large numbers of young people to enter Brazilian studies and recruited many, from both the United States and Brazil, to undertake doctoral studies in economics under his direction.

Baer's multiple contributions have been widely recognized in Brazil. He received the prestigious Rio Branco Medal from the Brazilian Ministry of Foreign Affairs (December 2000), the Medalha de Honra da Inconfidência from the state of Minas Gerais (1995), and the National Order of the Southern Cross from the government of Brazil (1982).

He served as a visiting lecturer at the Pontifical Catholic University of Rio de Janeiro, Brazil as well as the New University of Lisbon, Portugal. He also served as an assistant professor at Yale and an instructor at Harvard.

Werner Baer died after a sudden and brief illness on March 31, 2016.

== Other information ==
- The Brazilian Economy:Development and Growth
- CV
- Brazilian television interview (in Portuguese)
- Brazilian television interview (in Portuguese)
