= Hou Yu-li =

Taiwanese cloth merchant and entrepreneur

Hou Yu-li (Chinese: 侯雨利; February 11, 1900 — June 23, 1989) was a Taiwanese cloth merchant and entrepreneur, known as a Tainan textile capitalist. He was one of the leaders of the "Tainan Gang" in the business community of Southern Taiwan, and alongside Wang Yongqing, the founder of Formosa Plastics Group, was known as Southern Hou & Northern Wang (南侯北王).

== Early life ==
Hou Yu-li was born on February 11, 1900, in Erzhonggang (now Renli), Beimen, Tainan in Taiwan. His ancestors had been fighting for several years over the burial site of a mausoleum there.

His father, Hou Chiang (侯江), was a subsistence farmer who died when Yu-li was four years old. He was raised by his mother, Lee Kua (李瓜), who had no formal education. Hou Yu-li was eight or nine years old when he was enrolled in the Beimen Public School, but dropped out barely a year later due to the family's financial troubles. By the time he was eleven years old, he was working four different jobs, earning small salaries to help his mother support the family.

== Business ==
At 14, Yu-li was taken as an apprentice by his uncle Hou Ji (侯基) to work at his new clothing factory. After four years there he left the job to make his own living. When he was 20 years old and working as a cloth peddler, he married Wu Wu-hsiang (吳烏香) from Jiutougang, a neighboring village. In 1926, when he was 27 years old, he moved to Tainan City and reunited with some old relatives, though a year later they split up, with Hou Tiao (侯調) operating his own business, Hou Pai (侯排) continuing to innovate, and Hou Yu-li opening the Hsinfuancheng (新復興) cloth company. When Yu-li started out, he rented a house on Shanhang Street (now Puji Street), but he had a unique vision and was good at business, so after three years, he had enough money to buy a new house next to the Kaiju Temple, which was used as both a store and a residence. After five years, the annual turnover of Hsinfuancheng reached 350,000. In the 1930s, he became a leader among cloth wholesalers in the Tainan area.

Two years after the creation of Hsinfuancheng, Hou Yu-li travelled to Japan. He used a bank employee as an interpreter to purchase directly from Japanese firms, saving the transfer costs of Taiwanese intermediaries. Later, Hou went to Japan alone without an interpreter. Although he didn't speak Japanese at first besides simple negotiation terms, working directly with Japanese cloth shops to purchase goods saved him a lot of money and created many new business opportunities. In 1931, a businessman surnamed Cai in Tainan downtown operated a weaving factory near Mazu Tower (Zhongxiao Street, Tainan City), which was badly managed and sought a transfer of ownership. Hou took the opportunity to buy the factory and changed it into a Hsinfuancheng textile factory that produced its own fabrics. Around 1935, in order to expand business opportunities, Hou Yuli went to Hong Kong and Xiamen to engage in cloth trade. As he was not familiar with business in those areas, he left with huge losses. Except for the reservation of cloth shops and cloth factory equipment, his capital was almost in deficit. It was not until shortly after the outbreak of the Second Sino-Japanese War that Hou's career came back to life.

The war's outbreak affected the clothing industry greatly. The materials in the Japanese mainland were controlled and the black market prevailed. Hou took the opportunity to travel to Osaka to buy controlled materials and trade with them in Taiwan and Japan. The profits of those few years were extremely abundant. With his newfound earnings, Hou retreated from Japan and bought closed cloth shops, pieces of land in Tainan, and fish farms in Binhai, Beimen, Qigu and other places in the western district of the urban area. He managed fish farms as an enterprise and made greater income off of them than the land cost to rent. After the new government took power, it implemented a policy of "land to the tiller". All his Grade III cultivated land had to be released, except for the fish farm land. Later on, most of the fish farms would be re-zoned into urban areas (such as the western area of old Tainan City).

In 1945, when the government of the Republic of China took over Taiwan, the Hsinfuancheng Textile Factory immediately returned to work, becoming Hou's golden chicken in the absence of other options. Hou also took the opportunity to devote himself to research, constantly improving the design and quality of his assets so as to increase the value of Hsinfuancheng products. In the 35th year of the Republic of China (1946), Hou Yu-li bought the house at No. 67, Section 1, Dihua Street, Taipei City, as the Taipei liaison office of the Hsinfuancheng Cloth Factory, and engaged in lending and interest taking, as well as making a number of corporate investments.

== Death ==
Hou Yuli died in June 1989.
