= Chinese customs gold unit =

Former currency of China

海關金單位兌換券 (Chinese) CGU
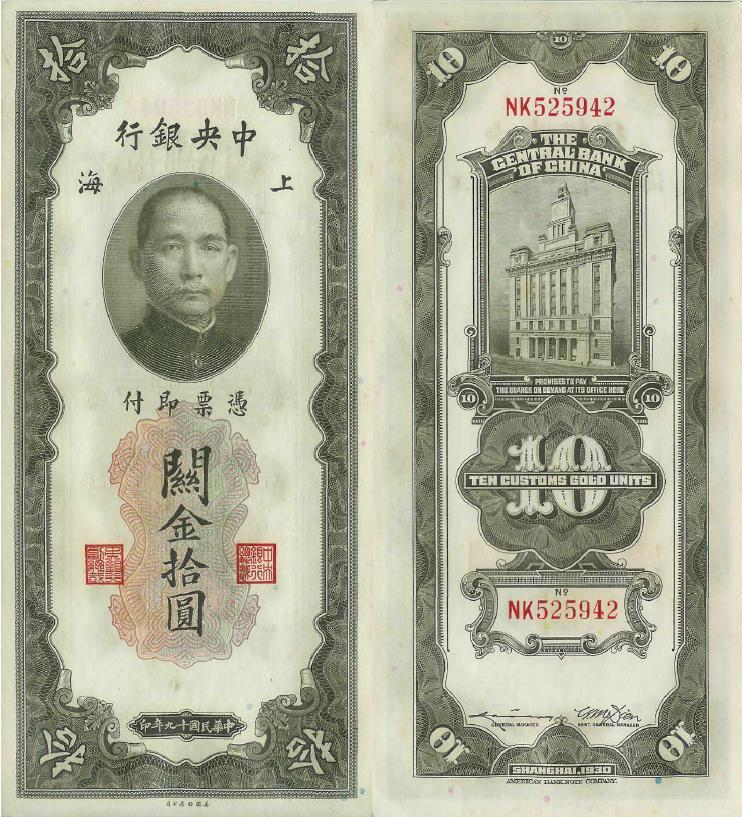
10 customs gold units
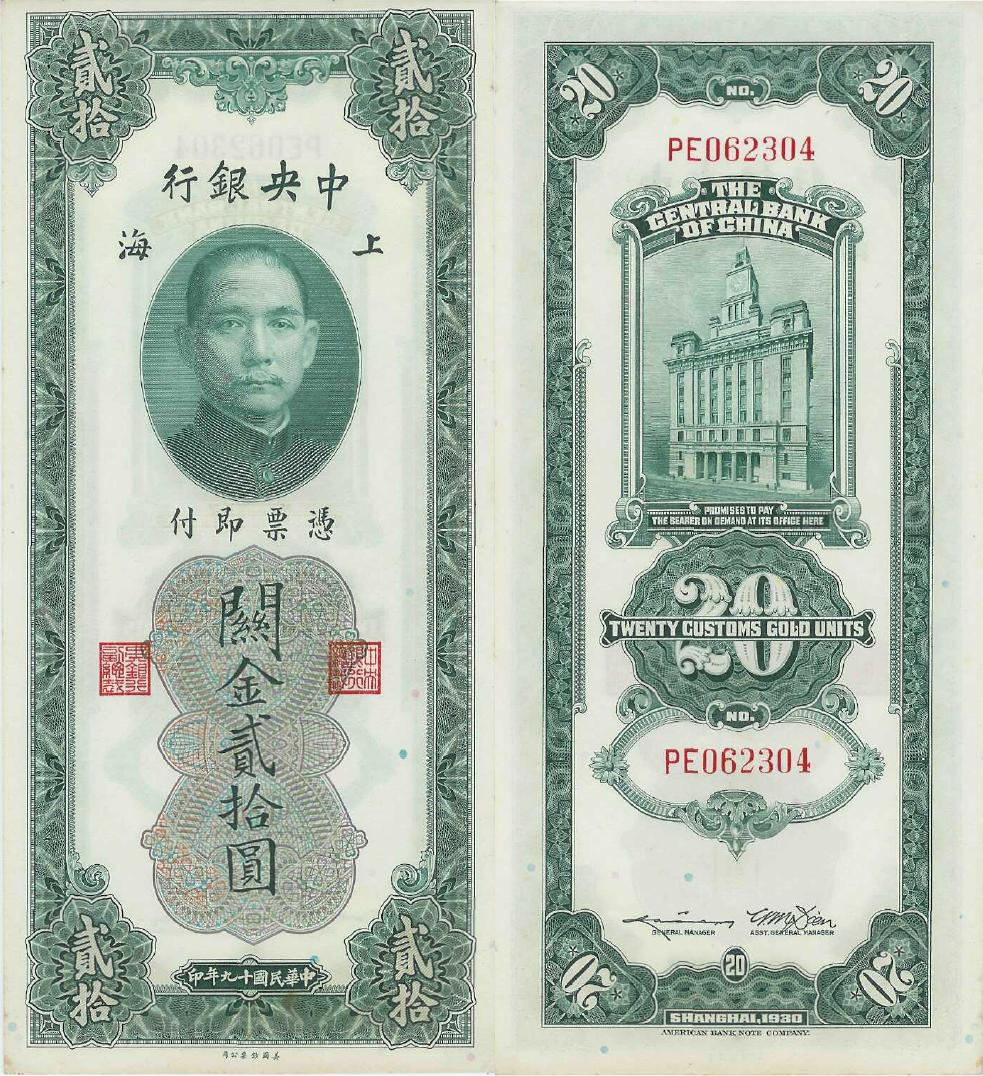
20 customs gold units

ISO 4217
- Code: none

Denominations
- Subunit
- 1/100: cent (分, Fen)
- Banknotes: 0.10, 0.20, 1, 5, 10, 20, 50, 100, 250, 500, 1000, 2000, 2500, 5000, 10,000, 25,000, 50,000, 250,000 CGUs
- Coins: None

Demographics
- Date of introduction: 1930
- Replaced: tael
- Date of withdrawal: 1948
- Replaced by: Chinese gold yuan
- Official user(s): China
- Unofficial users: Tibet; Jiangxi; First East Turkestan Republic; Second East Turkestan Republic; Manchukuo

Issuance
- Central bank: Central Bank of China
- Website: www.cbc.gov.tw
- Printer: American Bank Note Company and more (see article)
- This infobox shows the latest status before this currency was rendered obsolete.

Chinese customs gold unit
- Traditional Chinese: 海關金單位兌換券
- Simplified Chinese: 海关金单位兑换券
- Literal meaning: customs gold exchange voucher
Transcriptions
Standard Mandarin
- Hanyu Pinyin: hǎiguān jīn dānwèi duìhuàn quàn

The customs gold unit (CGU, Chinese: 海關金單位兌換券 (Note: 關金 for short)) was a currency issued by the Central Bank of China between 1930 and 1948. In Chinese, the name of the currency was Chinese: 關金圓, romanized: guānjīnyuán, lit. 'customs gold yuan') but the English name given on the back of the notes was "customs gold unit". It was divided into 100 cents (關金分). As the name suggests, this currency was initially used for customs payments, but in 1942 it was put into general circulation for use by the public at 20 times its face value in terms of the first Chinese yuan.

== History ==
The customs gold unit was adopted on 1 February 1930 to replace the Haikwan (Hǎiguān) or Customs tael (Chinese: 海關両, romanized: hǎiguān liǎng) as the standard for customs payments. It was defined as equal to 601.866 mg fine gold or US$0.40. CGU notes were fully backed by silver and were legal tender for paying import duties. The CGU replaced the Haikwan tael at CGU150 = HkT100.

The CGU's value, fixed against the US dollar, fluctuated against the Chinese yuan, based on the current yuan–dollar and yuan–sterling market exchange rates. After the UK abandoned gold in September 1931, only the yuan–dollar rate was used until 1933, when the sterling price of gold in the London market determined the value of the CGU. Central Bank of China sold CGU notes at the prevailing quotation so that businessmen could minimize exchange risks resulting from changes in the yuan–dollar and yuan–sterling exchange rates. Use of this currency was very limited, with only about CGU375,000–475,000 outstanding at the time of the 1935 currency reform.

The Chinese currency reform of 3 November 1935, which created the Chinese national yuan or dollar (CNC$), commonly known as the Chinese legal tender dollar or fapi in English (Chinese: 法幣; pinyin: fǎbì), also fixed an exchange rate of CGU100 = CNC$226.

The CGU's role in paying custom duties disappeared in 1941 when the government set ad valorem customs rates. On 1 April 1942 the custom gold unit's theoretical gold content was raised to 888.671 mg fine gold, equal to one US dollar. In practice, the customs gold unit lost all its special features and simply became equivalent to 20 Chinese legal tender dollars (CGU1 = CNC$20).

When Nationalist troops and officials arrived in Shanghai in 1945, they brought with them newly printed notes of 20 and 50 customs gold units. These notes proved more popular locally than Chinese legal tender notes and, due to a mistaken belief in the existence of a gold-redemption clause, they commanded a premium when exchanged for Central Reserve Bank notes of the Nanking National Government. CGU notes circulated alongside ordinary legal tender notes until 1948, when both were replaced by the gold yuan at the rate of 1 gold yuan = 3,000,000 Chinese legal tender dollars = 150,000 customs gold units.

== Banknotes ==
On 1 May 1930, the Central Bank of China put into circulation notes in denominations of 0.10, 0.20, 1, 5, and 10 customs gold units. These notes were printed by American Bank Note Company and dated 1930.

On 1 April 1942, the Central Bank of China began to put into circulation its unissued stock of about CGU100 million in 1930-dated notes, including 20 and 50 denominations, not circulated previously.

In January 1947, the Central Bank of China released notes of 250 and 500 customs gold units. Although dated 1930, these notes had been printed by American Bank Note Company in 1946. Inflation led to yet higher denominations: 1000, 2000, 5000 in December 1947, and 10,000, 25,000, 50,000, and 250,000 in July 1948, shortly before the currency reform of that year.

Several note types were produced by nine different printers, with slight differences in guilloche and size, but maintaining the same general design, with Dr. Sun Yat-sen on the face and the Shanghai Customs House on the back. The back of some of the notes bore the following English text preceding the denomination: "The Central Bank of China promises to pay the bearer on demand at its office here." Printers included the American Bank Note Company, Waterlow and Sons, the Security Banknote Company, the Chung Hua Book Company, Thomas De La Rue, The HongKong Printing Press Ltd. and the China Engraving and Printing Works.

== See also ==
- History of Chinese currency
- Chinese yuan
- Economy of China
- Economic history of China (Pre-1911)
- Economic history of China
