= Central Bank of the Republic of China (Taiwan) =

Bank headquartered in Taipei, Taiwan

Central Bank of the Republic of China 中華民國中央銀行

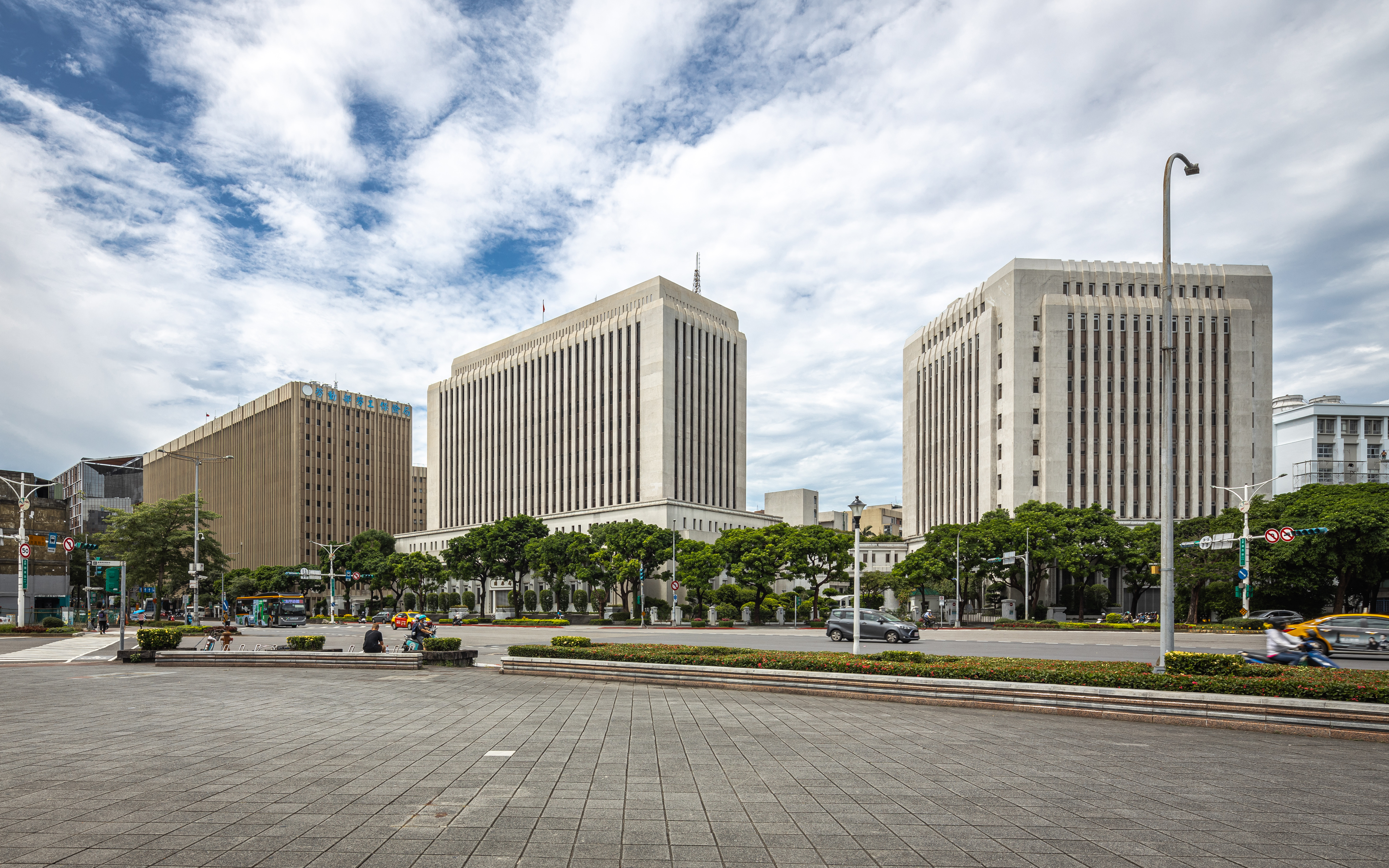
- CBC headquarters; before moving there in the 1970s, the CBC's operations were scattered across various locations in Taipei
- Central bank of: Republic of China (Taiwan)
- Headquarters: Zhongzheng, Taipei
- Established: 1924 (in Guangzhou); 1928 (in Shanghai); 1949 (in Taipei)
- Ownership: Executive Yuan of the Central Government of the ROC
- Governor: Yang Chin-long
- Currency: New Taiwan Dollar; TWD (ISO 4217)
- Bank rate: 2.0% (13 June 2024)
- Website: cbc.gov.tw (in English)

Central Bank
- Traditional Chinese: 中央銀行
- Simplified Chinese: 中央银行
Transcriptions
Standard Mandarin
- Hanyu Pinyin: Zhōngyāng Yínháng
- Bopomofo: ㄓㄨㄥ ㄧㄤ ㄧㄣˊ ㄏㄤˊ
- Gwoyeu Romatzyh: Jong'iang Ynharng
- Wade–Giles: Chung¹-yang¹ In²-Hang²
- Tongyong Pinyin: Jhongyang Yínháng
- MPS2: Jūngyāng Yínháng
Hakka
- Pha̍k-fa-sṳ: Tûng-ông Ngiùn-hòng
Southern Min
- Hokkien POJ: Tiong-iang-gîn-hâng; Tiong-iong-gûn-hâng

The Central Bank of the Republic of China (Chinese: 中華民國中央銀行; pinyin: Zhōnghuá Mínguó Zhōngyāng Yínháng), formerly the Central Bank of China from 1924 to 2007 and still referred to by its acronym CBC, is the central bank of Taiwan, headquartered in Taipei. Established in 1924 in Guangzhou, the bank relocated to Taiwan after the Chinese Civil War and assumed control over banknote issuance from the Bank of Taiwan in 1961.

Its legal and common name in Chinese is literally translated as the "Central Bank" (Chinese: 中央銀行). The central bank is administered under the Executive Yuan of the ROC government.

== History ==
=== Mainland China (1924-1949) ===
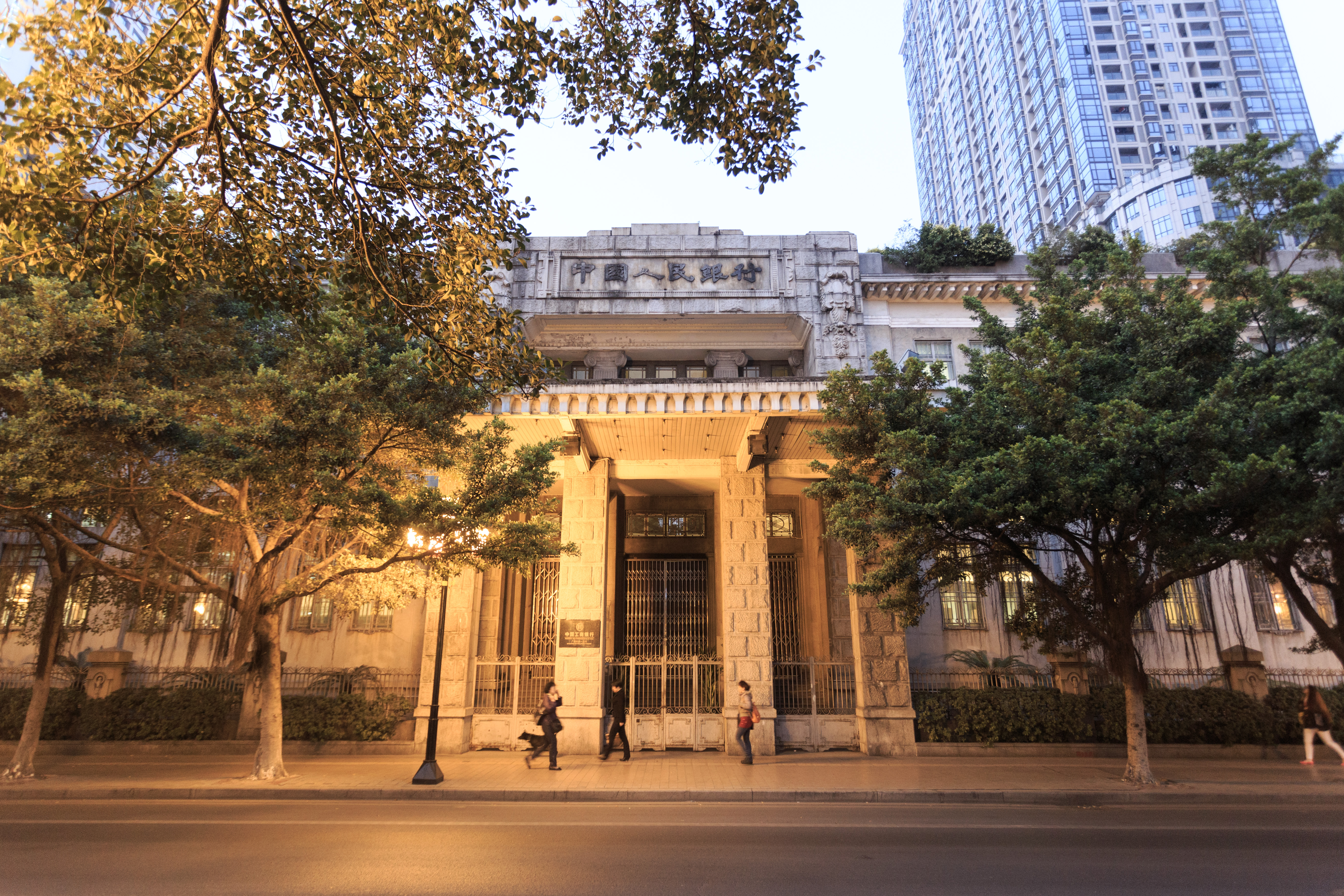
Central Bank of China headquarters between 1924 and 1927 in Guangzhou, Guangdong

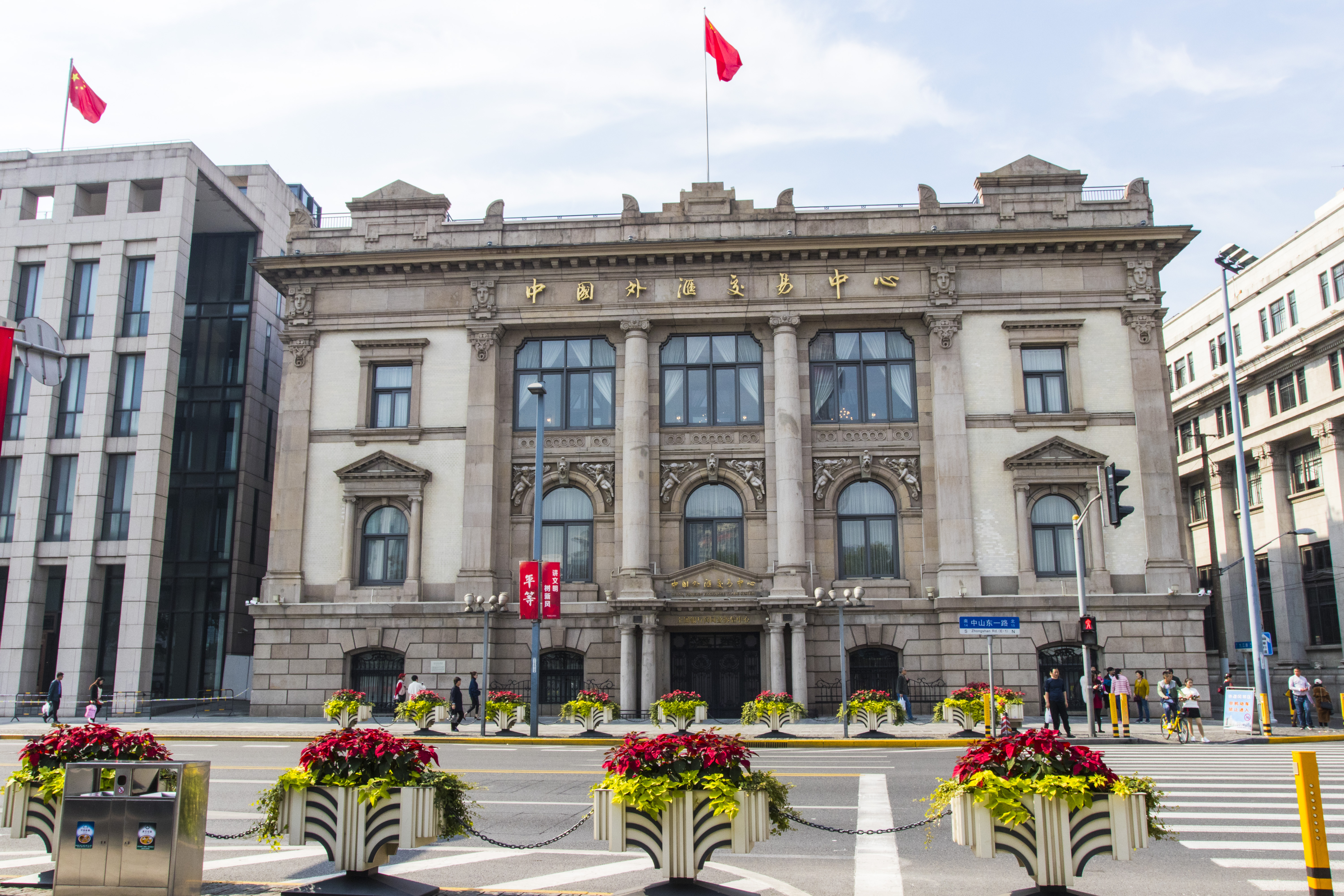
Central Bank of China headquarters between 1928 and 1949 in Shanghai, former Russo-Chinese Bank Building on the Bund

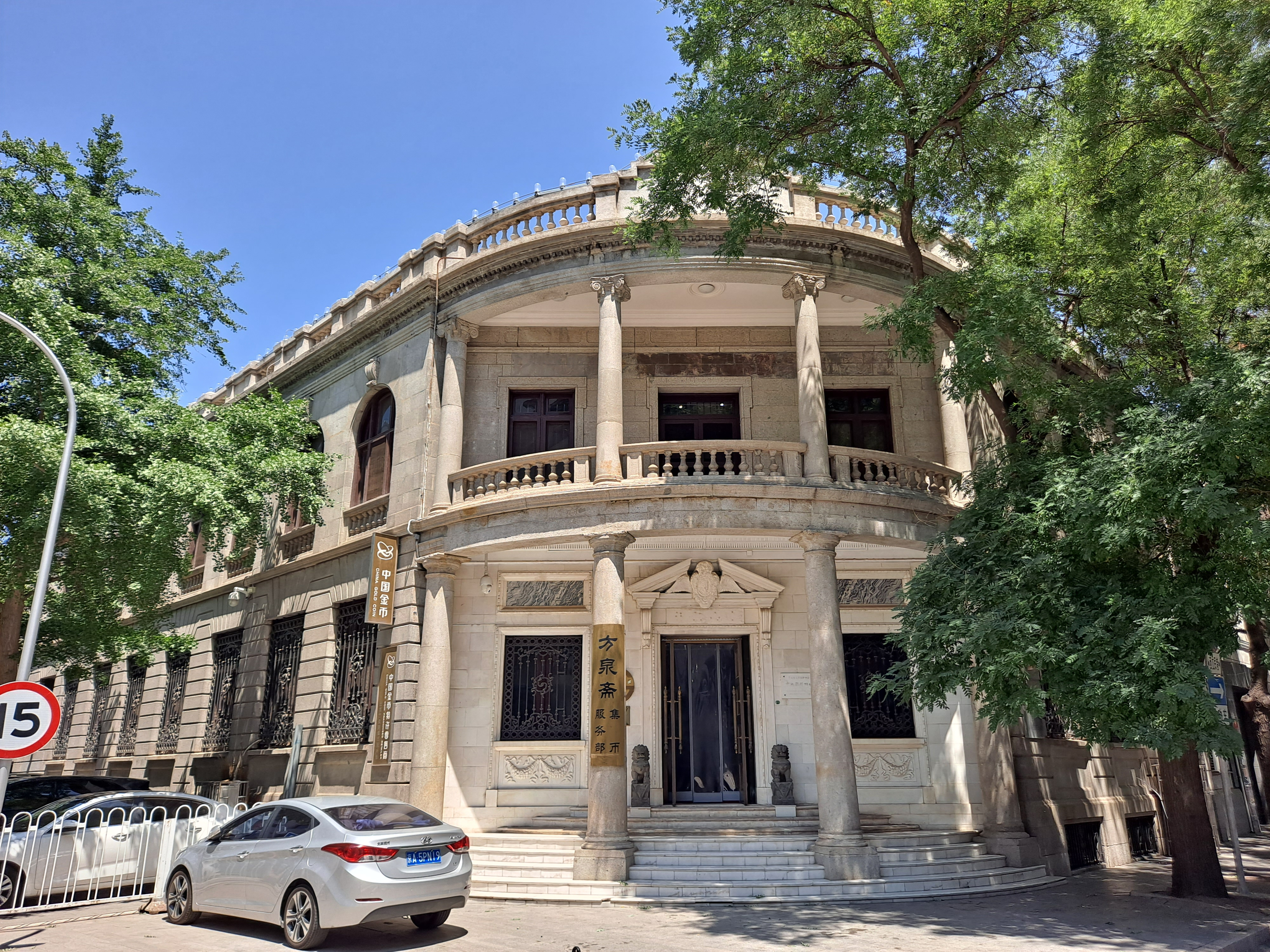
Former branch of the Central Bank of China on West Jiaomin Lane in Beijing

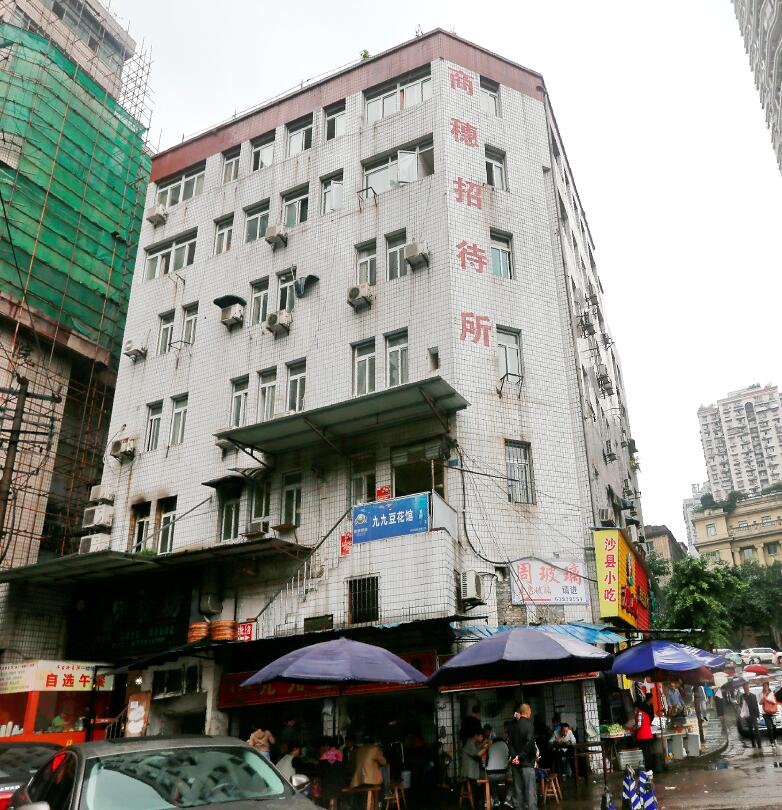
A building on the former site of the (demolished) CBC building in Chongqing

The CBC was originally proposed in 1923 by Sun Yat-sen's Army and Navy Marshal stronghold of the Republic of China and was established in Guangzhou a year later, serving the Nationalist government from 1925. Following the success of the Northern Expedition, the CBC relocated to Shanghai and its head T. V. Soong negotiated a division of labor with the Bank of China in 1928 that refocused the latter on foreign-exchange operations. It was subsequently one of China's "Big Four" national banks, along with the Bank of China, Bank of Communications, and Farmers Bank of China, all of which were major banks of issue.

In 1932, the CBC lost jurisdiction over Northeast China to the Central Bank of Manchou in Changchun. Its role in the rest of the country was reinforced in the mid-1930s when the Nationalist government gave it a monopoly over note issuance, as part of a broader monetary overhaul that included the abandonment of China's prior silver standard. That reform was initially successful, but the CBC - together with the Nationalist government - soon lost control over parts of North China to the Mengjiang Bank in Kalgan and the United Reserve Bank in Peiping, then over central-eastern China to the Huaxing Commercial Bank then the Central Reserve Bank in Shanghai and Nanjing. In 1937-1938 it relocated to Wuhan, then Chongqing together with the government. In late July 1942, it was granted a monopoly over currency issuance in the territorial area controlled by the Nationalist government.

In 1945, the CBC recovered its Shanghai head office and its nationwide role, but soon had to face the circumstances of the Chinese Civil War and moved together with the government back to Guangzhou, Chongqing, and Chengdu before completing the journey to Taiwan in late 1949. Its archives were lost in the wreckage of the Taiping, which added difficulty to the resumption of its operations in Taiwan.

=== Taiwan (since 1949) ===
While the CBC was the island's central bank from 1949, the Bank of Taiwan, a commercial bank founded in 1897 during Japanese colonial rule, kept issuing banknotes until the CBC assumed that role in 1961. On 8 November 1979, the newly revised Central Bank of China Act was promulgated. The Bank of Taiwan issued the New Taiwan dollar until 2000 when the Central Bank of China finally took over the task. In 2007 the English name of the Central Bank of China was renamed the Central Bank of the Republic of China (Taiwan) along with a host of other renamings under the Chen Shui-bian administration of state-owned corporations with "China" in their name, such as the Chunghwa Post.

== Organizational structure ==
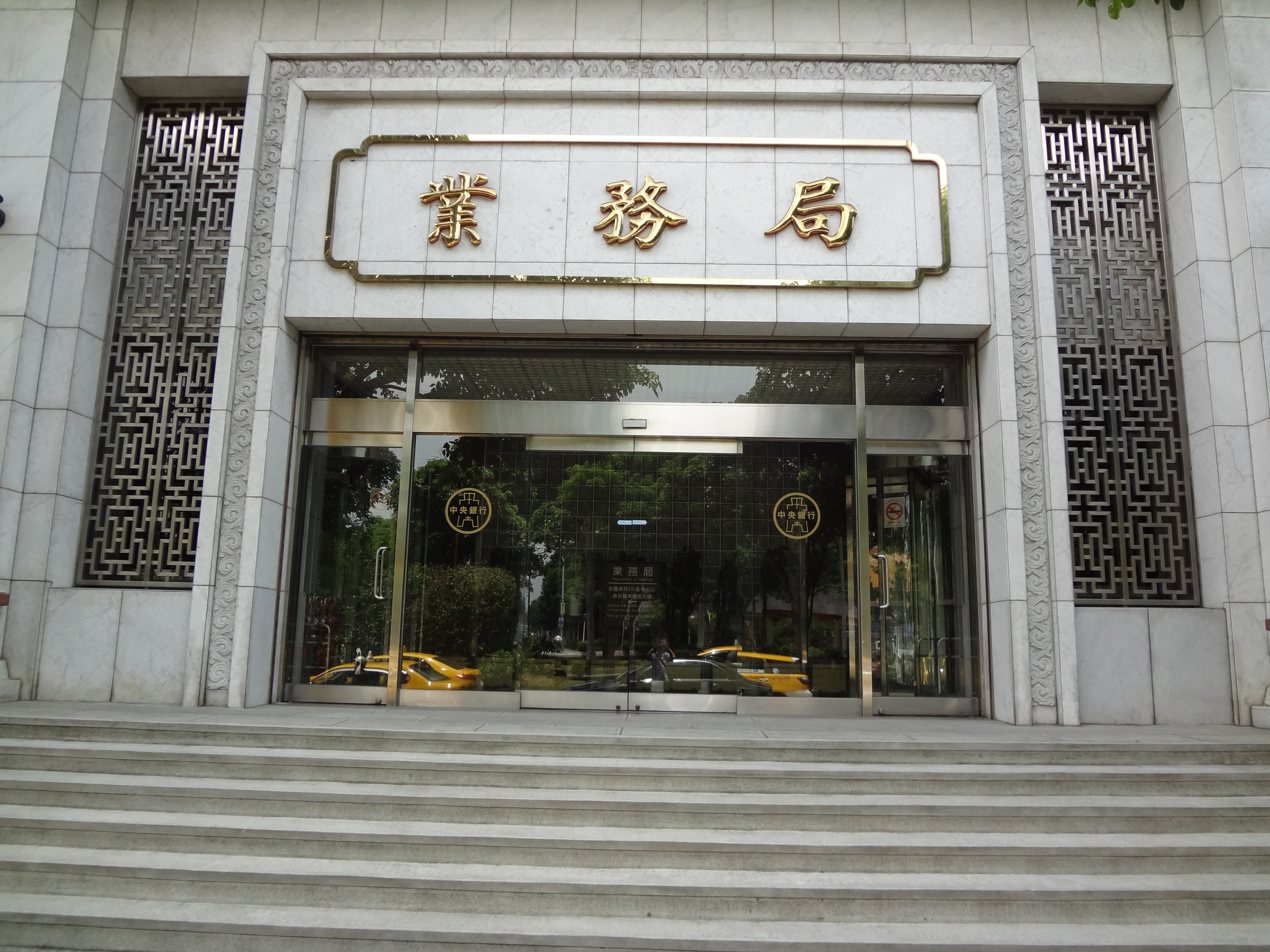
Entrance to the CBC Department of Banking

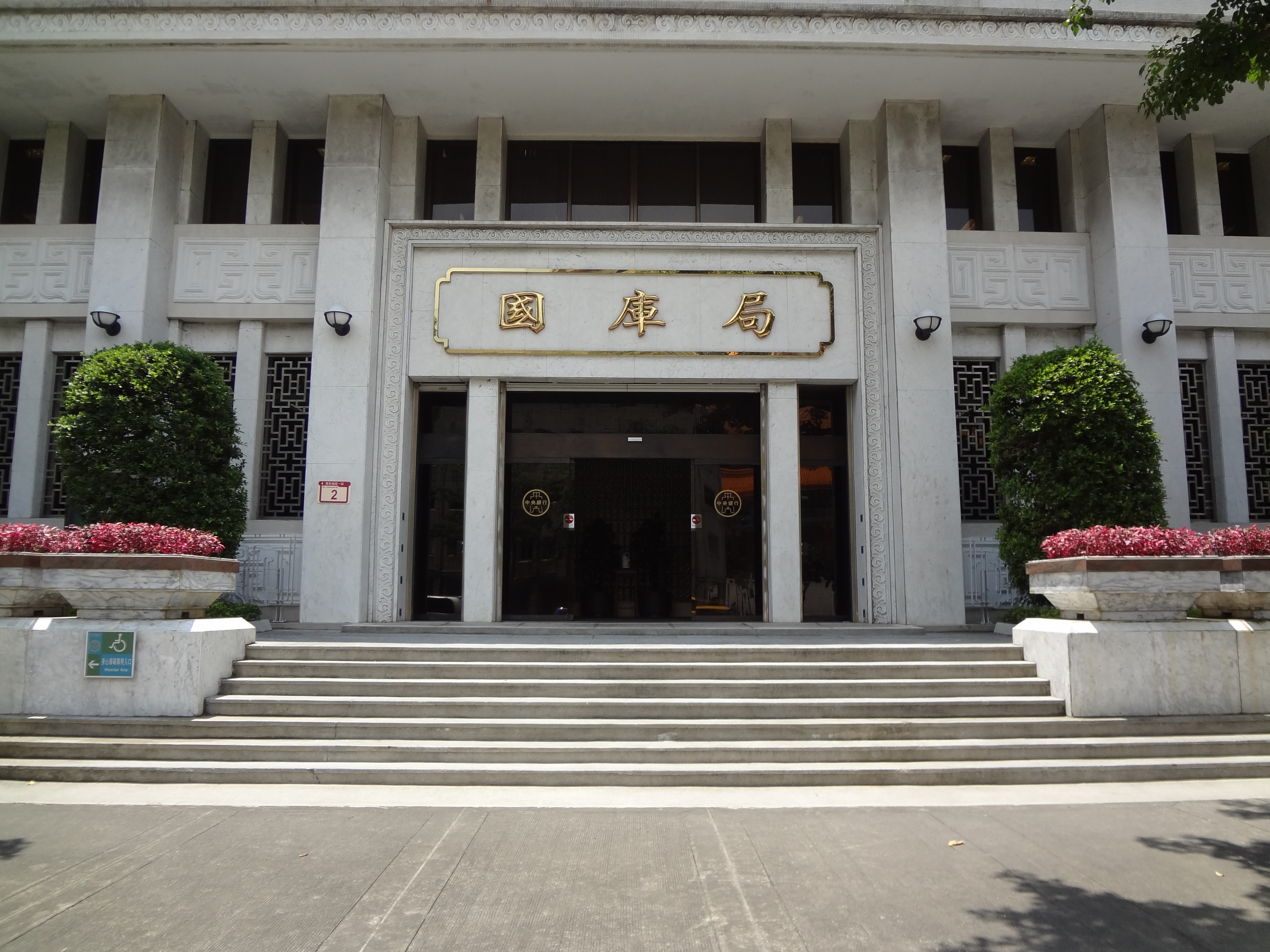
Entrance to the CBC Department of the Treasury

- Department of Banking
- Department of Issuing
- Department of Foreign Exchange
- Department of the Treasury
- Department of Financial Inspection
- Department of Economic Research
- Secretariat
- Department of Accounting
- Department of Information Management
- Personnel Office
- Ethics Office
- Legal Affairs Office
- New York City Representative Office
- London Representative Office

== List of governors ==
№	Name	Term of office		Days	Cabinet
Governor of CBC (Guangzhou)
1	T. V. Soong (宋子文)	15 August 1924	February 1928		
Governor of CBC
1	T. V. Soong (宋子文)	February 1928	December 1931		
1	T. V. Soong (宋子文)	February 1932	6 April 1933		
2	H. H. Kung (孔祥熙)	6 April 1933	26 July 1945	4494	
3	Yu Hung-chun (俞鴻鈞)	26 July 1945	6 February 1946	195	
4	Tsuyee Pei (貝祖貽)	6 February 1946	28 February 1947	387	
5	Chang Kia-ngau (張嘉璈)	1 March 1947	21 May 1948	447	Zhang Qun
6	Yu Hung-chun (俞鴻鈞)	21 May 1948	19 January 1949	243	Weng Wenhao; Sun Fo
7	Liu Kung-yun (劉攻芸)	19 January 1949	24 June 1949	156	Sun Fo; He Yingqin; Yan Xishan
8	Hsu Kan (徐堪)	24 June 1949	5 October 1949	1199	Yan Xishan
9	Yu Hung-chun (俞鴻鈞)	26 January 1950	1 June 1960 (Note: Died in office.)	3779	Yan Xishan; Chen Cheng I Yu Hung-chun; Chen Cheng II
10	Hsu Po-yuan (徐柏園)	27 July 1960	29 April 1969	3198	Chen Cheng II; Yen Chia-kan
11	Yu Kuo-hwa (俞國華)	25 June 1969	30 May 1984	5453	Yen Chia-kan; Chiang Ching-kuo; Sun Yun-suan; Yu Kuo-hua
12	Chang Chi-cheng (張繼正)	21 June 1984	June 1989		Yu Kuo-hua; Lee Huan
13	Hsieh Sam-chung (謝森中)	June 1989	May 1994		Lee Huan; Hau Pei-tsun; Lien Chan
14	Liang Kuo-shu (梁國樹)	1 June 1994	20 March 1995		Lien Chan
15	Sheu Yuan-dong (許遠東)	20 March 1995	16 February 1998	1064	Lien Chan; Vincent Siew
16	Perng Fai-nan (彭淮南)	25 February 1998	26 February 2018 (Note: Longest-serving governor.)	7306	Vincent Siew; Tang Fei; Chang Chun-hsiung I Yu Shyi-kun; Frank Hsieh; Su Tseng-chang I Chang Chun-hsiung II; Liu Chao-shiuan; Wu Den-yih; Sean Chen; Jiang Yi-huah; Mao Chi-kuo; Chang San-cheng; Lin Chuan; William Lai
17	Yang Chin-long (楊金龍)	26 February 2018	Incumbent	3138	William Lai; Su Tseng-chang II; Chen Chien-jen

== Access ==
The headquarters building is accessible within walking distance northwest from Chiang Kai-shek Memorial Hall MRT station of the Taipei Metro.

== See also ==
- Central Mint
- Central Engraving and Printing Plant
- Economy of Taiwan
- List of central banks
