= Currency of Taiwan =

Currency of Taiwan can refer to any of the following:

- Taiwanese yen issued by the colonial government of Taiwan under Japanese rule from 1895 to 1945
- Old Taiwan dollar used from 1946 to 1949
- New Taiwan dollar the currency of Taiwan since 1949.

== See also ==
- Chinese currency (disambiguation)
