= Chinese cash =

Chinese cash may refer to:

- Chinese cash (currency unit) (文; wén), a Chinese currency unit used on cash coins in imperial and early republican China
- Cash (Chinese coin) (方孔錢; fāng kǒng qián), a Chinese copper coin used in imperial and early republican China
- Cash (unit) (厘; lí), equivalent to 1/1000 tael or a currency equivalent to that weight in silver
- Any of the various other historical Chinese units of currency
- Yuan Renminbi, the present currency of the People's Republic of China
- New Taiwan dollar, the present currency of the Republic of China, also known as Taiwan

== See also ==
- Chinese currency (disambiguation)
