= Chinese currency =

The term Chinese currency may refer to:

- Renminbi, the currency of the People's Republic of China
- New Taiwan dollar, the currency of the Republic of China (Taiwan)
- Hong Kong dollar, the currency of Hong Kong SAR
- Yuan (currency), the base unit of a number of former and present-day currencies in China.
  - Jiao (currency), 1/10 Yuan
  - Fen (currency), 1/100 Yuan (1/10 Jiao)

== Historical ==
- Chinese cash coins, a type of coin of China and the Sinosphere, used from the 4th century BC until the 20th century AD, characterised by their square center hole
- Ancient Chinese coinage

== See also ==
- History of Chinese currency
- Chinese cash (disambiguation)
- Currency of Taiwan (disambiguation)
