= History of Chinese currency =

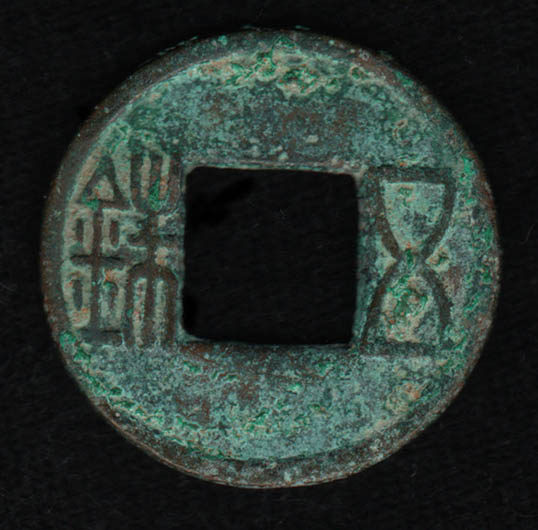
Han dynasty cash coin

The history of Chinese currency spans more than 3000 years from ancient China to imperial China and modern China. Currency of some type has been used in China since the Neolithic age which can be traced back to between 3000 and 4500 years ago. The history of China's monetary system traces back to the Shang dynasty (c. 1766–1154 BCE), where cowrie shells served as early currency. Cowry shells are believed to have been the earliest form of currency used in Central China, and were used during the Neolithic period. By the Warring States period, diverse metal currencies like knife and spade coins emerged. These early currencies, starting as a commodity exchange to cowrie shells, copper coins, paper money and modern Chinese currencies and digital currencies shows how centralized power developed the most influential monetary system in the world.

Early Establishment

The Shang dynasty (c. 1600 – c. 1046 BC) came as a significant first step in the evolution of currency by introducing cowrie shells as a mode of exchange. Cowries, sourced from the Indian Ocean, were valued for their rarity, durability, and portability. Their usage as currency likely came from their symbolic value which represented wealth and status. Archaeological findings, such as cowrie shell imitations made of bone and stone, indicate the growing institutionalization of monetary practices during this period. One of the reasons why they started producing cowrie shell imitations was mainly due to the lack of organic cowrie shells. New Research on the Origin of Cowries in Ancient China by K.Peng also mentions tributes and exchanges involving cowries, highlighting their role in economic context.

Zhou dynasty ((Western Zhou c. 1046 – 771 BC) and (Eastern Zhou c. 771 – 256 BC)) saw the diversification of currency forms. By the late Western Zhou and early Eastern Zhou, bronze objects such as spades and knife-shaped coins began circulating alongside cowries. These currencies reflected both regional economic diversity and the growing influence of metalworking technologies.

The Warring States period (c. 475 – 221 BC) expanded on the diversity of currencies as competing states issued their own coinages to assert economic independence. Bronze inscriptions on Zhou coins serve as primary evidence which gives details about issuing authorities and intended denominations. These inscriptions show the relationship between political authority and economic systems.

Qin dynasty (c. 221 – 206 BC) specifically Around 210 BC, the first emperor of China Qin Shi Huang (260–210 BC) abolished all other forms of local currency and introduced a uniform "Ban Liang" copper coin which eliminated the regional variations that had characterized the Warring States period and showed economic integration and simplifying taxation. Qin legal texts found in tombs (e.g., Shuijingzhu bamboo slips) document the implementation of the Ban Liang coins and highlight their role in centralizing economic control. This standardization served as a model for future dynasties that influenced monetary policies in subsequent centuries.

Building on the Qin's monetary reforms, the Han dynasty (c. 202 BCE – 220 CE) later introduced "Wu Zhu" coins, which remained in circulation for over 700 years. The Han government's emphasis on coinage stability facilitated trade along the Silk Road, integrating China into a broader network of Eurasian commerce. These coins, marked by their consistent weight and size, reflected the dynasty's commitment to economic stability. The Han period also saw the integration of commodity trade and currency usage. Goods like silk, salt, and iron often supplemented or substituted coinage in transactions, particularly in regions where coin circulation was limited.

Paper money was invented in China in the 7th century, but the base unit of currency remained the copper coin. Copper coins were used as the chief denomination of currency in China until the introduction of the yuan.

From paper money innovations in the Song dynasty to the turbulent reforms of the late Qing, China's monetary system evolved with its political and economic changes. Currently, the renminbi is the official currency of the People's Republic of China (PRC). It is the legal tender in mainland China, but not in Hong Kong or Macau. The special administrative regions of Hong Kong and Macau use the Hong Kong dollar and the Macanese pataca, respectively. In the territory controlled by the Republic of China (ROC), the New Taiwan dollar is the official legal tender in Taiwan since 2000.

== Ancient currencies ==
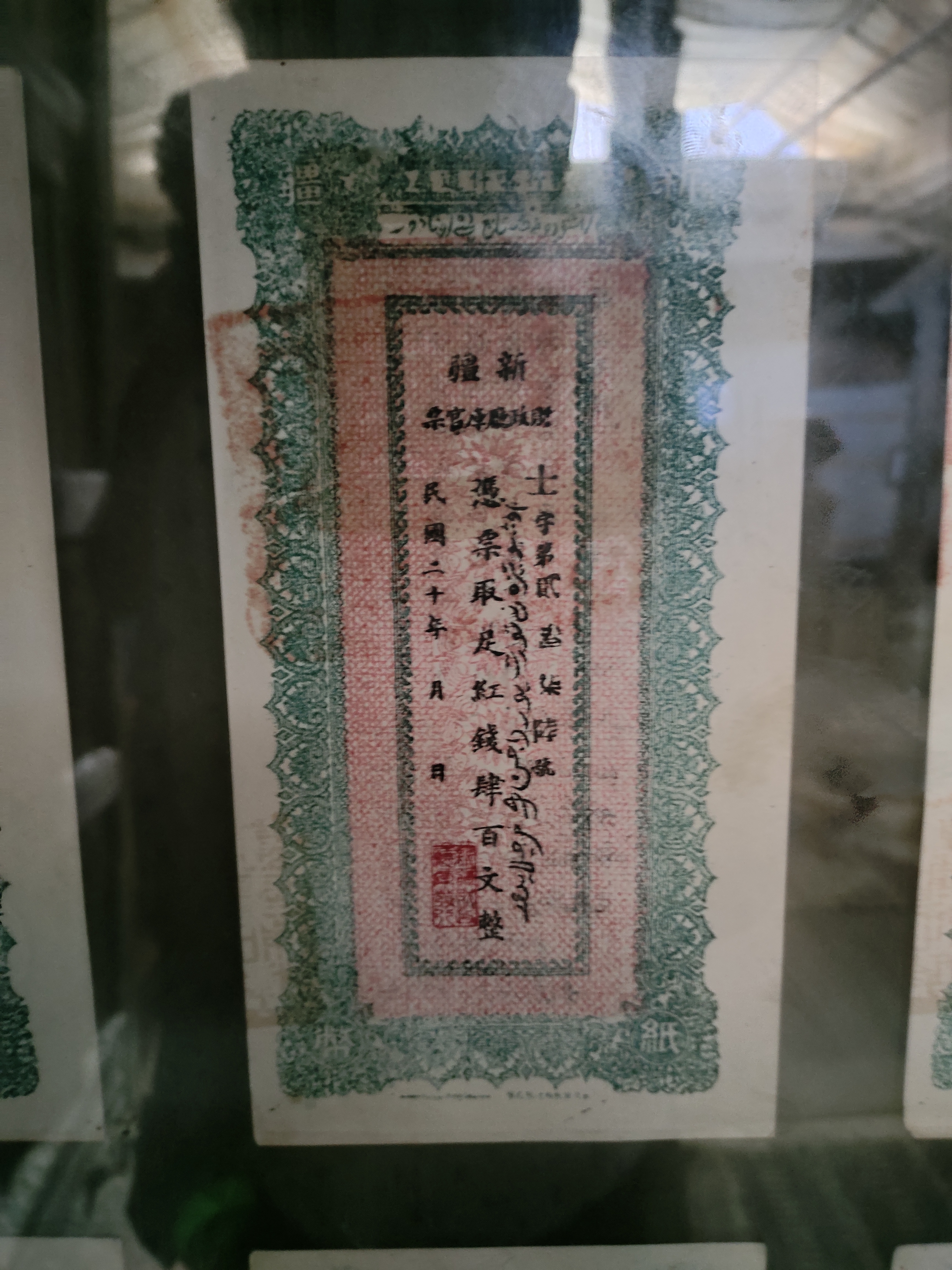
Old Chinese Currency used in 1920–23. This currency was also used in Hunza state.

The use of shell money is attested to in the Chinese writing system. The traditional characters for 'goods' (貨), 'buy/sell' (買/賣), and 'monger' (販), in addition to various other words relating to 'exchange', all contain the radical 貝, which is the pictograph for shell (simplified to 贝). The extent of the circulation of shell money is unknown, and barter trade may have been common. However, copies of cowry shells made out of bone, wood, stone, lead and copper were common enough to presume that they were used in trade.

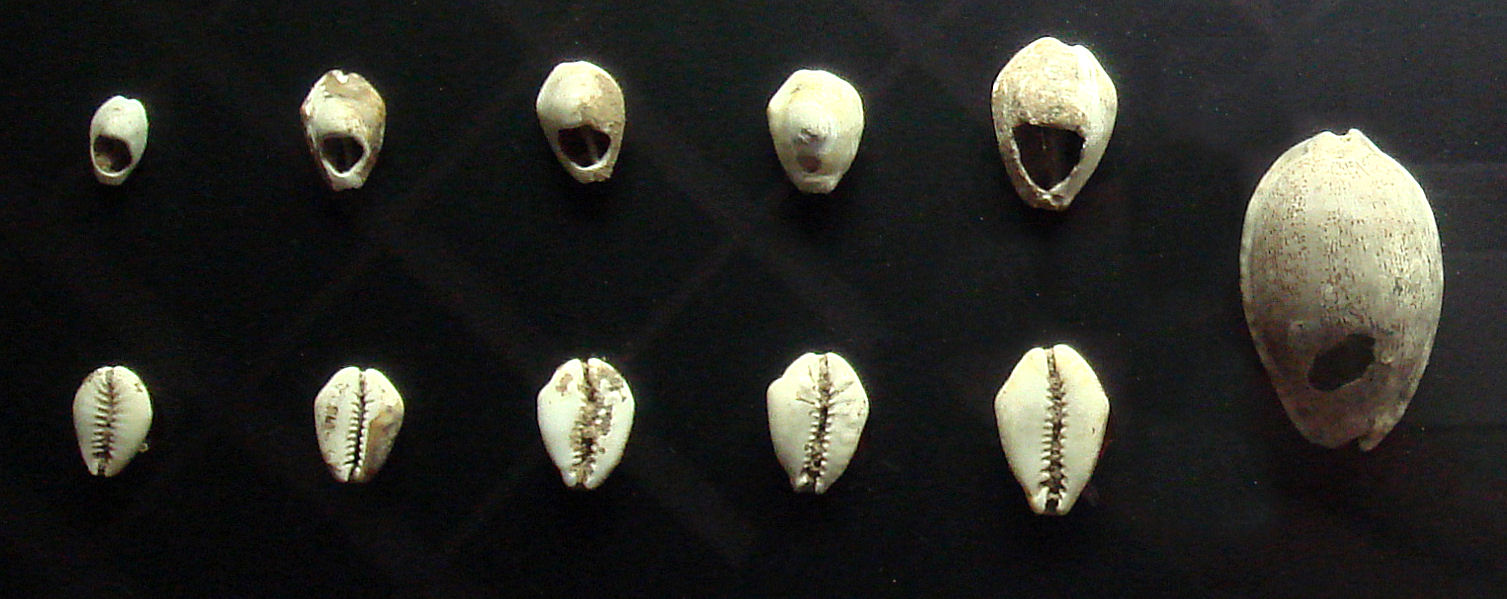
Chinese shell money, 16–8th century BCE.

Cowries, sourced from the Indian Ocean, were valued for their rarity, durability, and portability. Their usage as currency likely came from their symbolic and practical value which represented wealth and status. Archaeological findings, such as cowrie shell imitations made of bone and stone, indicate the growing institutionalization of monetary practices during this period. One of the reasons why they started producing cowrie shell imitations was mainly due to the lack of organic cowrie shells. New Research on the Origin of Cowries in Ancient China by K.Peng also mentions tributes and exchanges involving cowries, highlighting their role in both economic and ceremonial contexts.

The Chinese may have invented the first metal coins, coins found in Anyang date to before 900 BC. At that time, the coin itself was a mock of more earlier used cowry shells, so it was called the Bronze shell.

Bronzed shells were found in the ruins of Yin, the old capital of the Shang dynasty (1500–1046 BC). Bronze became the universal currency during the succeeding Zhou dynasty, which saw the diversification of currency forms. By the late Western Zhou and early Eastern Zhou, bronze objects such as spades and knife-shaped coins began circulating alongside cowries. During the Warring States period, from the 5th century BC to 221 BC, Chinese money consisted of three main types of bronze objects. The Zhou, the Wei (魏), the Han (韓) and the Qin (秦) all used coins shaped like a spade (bu). The Qi (齊) used money in the shape of a knife (dao). The Zhao (趙) and the Yan (燕) used knife money before switching over to spade money roughly halfway through the Warring States period. The Chu (楚) used money in the forms of "ant nose" coins (yibi).

=== Unification ===
As part of the Unification of China, Qin Shi Huang (Chinese: 秦始皇; pinyin: Qín Shǐ Huáng, 260 BC – 210 BC) introduced a uniform copper coin with the inscription "Ban Liang" based on the coins previously used by the Qin. All other forms of local currency were abolished. This standardization eliminated the regional variations that had characterized the Warring States period, fostering economic integration and simplifying taxation. Qin legal texts found in tombs document the implementation of the Ban Liang coins and highlight their role in centralizing economic control. The coins were round with a square hole in the middle which was the common design for most Chinese copper coins until the 20th century. Due to the low value of an individual coin, the Chinese have traditionally strung a nominal thousand copper coins onto a piece of string. Government taxes were levied on both coins and products such as rolls of silk. Salaries were paid in "stones" (石, dàn) of grain during the Qin and Han dynasties.

=== Han ===
The Han dynasty issued Wu Zhu coins, which remained in circulation for over 700 years. The Han government's emphasis on coinage stability facilitated trade along the Silk Road, integrating China into a broader network of Eurasian commerce. These coins were marked by their consistent weight and size. The Han period also saw the integration of commodity trade and currency usage. Goods like silk, salt, and iron often supplemented or substituted coinage in transactions, particularly in regions where coin circulation was limited.

=== Tang ===
By the time of the Tang dynasty, the solidification of Confucianism as the primary political school of thought had similarly entrenched China as an agrarian society. The Han dynasty had allowed for debate on government monopolies on the iron and salt trade, to which scholars voiced disapproval due to disreputable connotations on industry and commerce. Under the Tang dynasty, China saw the enactment of the two-tax system, or 两税法, that measured revenues against expenditures directly. As a result of policy, the dynasty set a static budget that was intended to be observed throughout the dynasty.

The Tang dynasty adopted an early prototype of paper currency starting with promissory notes in Sichuan called "flying money" (Feiqian/飞钱). These were designed to expedite trade between the Tang capital and urban centers, and the rural industrial bases, such as the mining of copper and iron in Sichuan. By issuing Feiqian, the Tang dynasty was able to lessen the burden and risk of transporting large amounts of currencies, such as the accumulated weight and the potential to be robbed in transit. Although they were traded among merchants, Jiaozi was not intended to be currency, but rather akin to modern day bank drafts. They could only be redeemed at government offices or the centers of government sponsored groups. These proved so useful the state took over production of this form of paper money with the first state-backed printing in 1024. By the 12th century, various forms of paper money had become the dominant forms of currency in China and were known by a variety of names such as jiaozi, huizi, kuaizi, or guanzi.

=== Song ===
During the early Song dynasty (Chinese: 宋, 960–1279), China again reunited the currency system, displacing coinages from ten or so independent states. Among pre-Song coins, the northern states tended to prefer copper coins. The southern states tended to use lead or iron coins, with Sichuan possessing its own heavy iron coins which continued to circulate for a short period into the Song dynasty. By 1000 CE, unification (south of the Liao) was complete and China experienced a period of rapid economic growth, reflected by the growth of coining. In 1073—the peak year for minting coins in the Northern Song—the government produced an estimated six million strings containing a thousand copper coins each. The Northern Song is thought to have minted over two hundred million strings of coins which were frequently exported to Inner Asia, Japan, and South-East Asia, where they often formed the dominant form of coinage.

The Song dynasty saw the first true introduction of paper money as currency. This was termed Jiaozi, or 交子, and saw initial adoption in Sichuan to facilitate the commodity trade. As it started to expand outside of Sichuan, the Song dynasty saw an increase in inflation due to the overprinting of paper money that didn't have sufficient backing in reserve through precious metals. Later dynasties such as the Yuan and Ming saw similar cases of inflation that lead to the Ming and Qing returning to silver as the primary method of commerce.

=== Yuan ===
The Mongol-founded Yuan dynasty (Chinese: 元, 1271–1368) also attempted to use paper currency. Unlike the Tang dynasty, they created a unified, national system that was not backed by silver or gold. The currency issued by the Yuan was the world's first fiat currency, known as Jiaochao. The Yuan government attempted to prohibit all transactions in or possession of silver or gold, which had to be turned over to the government. Inflation in 1260 caused the government to replace the existing paper currency with a new one in 1287, but inflation that resulted from undisciplined printing remained a problem for the Yuan court until the end of the Yuan dynasty.

The following is Marco Polo's account on the use of paper money as issued by the Yuan dynasty:

“With these pieces of paper, made as I have described, he [Khubilai Khan] causes all payments on his own account to be made; and he makes them to pass current universally over all his kingdoms and provinces and territories, and whithersoever his power and sovereignty extends. And nobody, however important he may think himself, dares to refuse them on pain of death. And indeed everybody takes them readily, for wheresoever a person may go throughout the Great Kaan’s dominions he shall find these pieces of paper current, and shall be able to transact all sales and purchases of goods by means of them just as well as if they were coins of pure gold. And all the while they are so light that ten bezants’ worth does not weigh one golden bezant.

Furthermore all merchants arriving from India or other countries, and bringing with them gold or silver or gems and pearls, are prohibited from selling to any one but the Emperor. He has twelve experts chosen for this business; these appraise the articles, and the Emperor then pays a liberal price for them in those pieces of paper. The merchants accept his price, for in the first place they would not get so good a one from anybody else, and secondly they are paid without any delay. And with this paper-money they can buy what they like anywhere over the Empire, whilst it is also vastly lighter to carry about on their journeys. Several times in the year, merchants brought wares to the amount of 400,000 bezants, and the Grand Sire pays for all in that paper. So he buys such a quantity of those precious things every year that his treasure is endless, whilst all the time the money he pays away costs him nothing at all. Moreover, several times in the year proclamation is made through the city that anyone who may have gold or silver or gems or pearls, by taking them to the Mint shall get a good price for them. And the owners are glad to do this, because they would find no other purchaser give so large a price. Still, in this way, nearly all the valuables in the country come into the Kaan’s possession.”

=== Ming ===
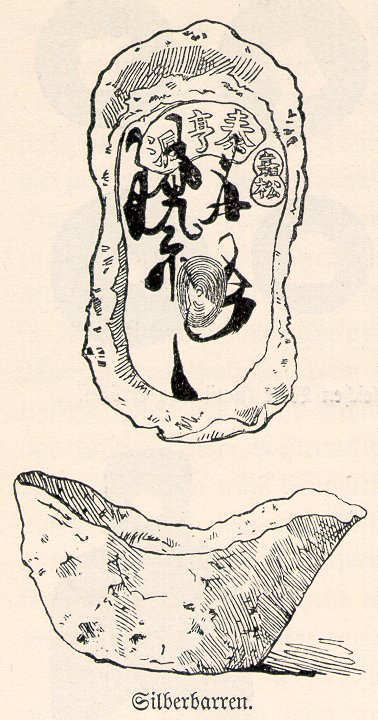
Silver sycee (yuanbao) ingots

The early Ming dynasty (Chinese: 明; pinyin: Míng, 1368–1644) also attempted to use paper currency in the early re-unification period. This currency also experienced rapid inflation and issues were suspended in 1450 although notes remained in circulation until 1573. It was only in the very last years of the Ming dynasty when Li Zicheng threatened Beijing in 1643 and 1645 that printing took place again. For most of the Ming, China had a purely private system of currency for all important transactions. Silver, which flowed in from overseas, began to be used as a currency in the Far South province of Guangdong, where it spread to the lower Yangtze region by 1423 when it became legal tender for payment of taxes. Provincial taxes had to be remitted to the capital in silver after 1465; salt producers had to pay in silver from 1475 and corvée exemptions had to be paid in silver from 1485. The Chinese demand for silver was met by traditional maritime silk road trade links, from either Quanzhou, Zhangzhou, Guangzhou, or Macau, with Manila in the Philippines as part of the Spanish East Indies who traded Philippine peso (Spanish silver dollars) for chinaware and other trade goods, after the Spanish colonial empire became established at Manila in 1571. The Spanish silver dollar were minted and mined from the Spanish Americas, in particular Potosí in Peru and Mexico. The trade of Spanish silver dollars with chinaware and other trade goods flowed through the Manila-Acapulco Galleon Trade from the Philippines to Mexico and vice versa within the Spanish colonial empire. It circulated as minted Spanish dollars sometimes stamped with Chinese characters known as "chop marks" which indicated that they were verified by a merchant and determined to be genuine. Spanish silver also circulated as ingots (known as sycee or yuanbao) which weighed a nominal liang (about 36 grams) although purity and weight varied from region to region. The liang was often referred to by Europeans by the Malay term tael. The first Chinese yuan coins had the same specification as a Spanish dollar, leading to a continuing equivalence in some respects between the names "yuan" and "dollar" in the Chinese language.

=== Qing ===
The period spanning the late Qing dynasty to the establishment of the People's Republic of China marked a critical phase in the evolution of China's monetary system. This era was characterized by efforts to unify fragmented currencies, stabilize the economy, and modernize financial governance, all unfolding against a backdrop of war and political upheaval.

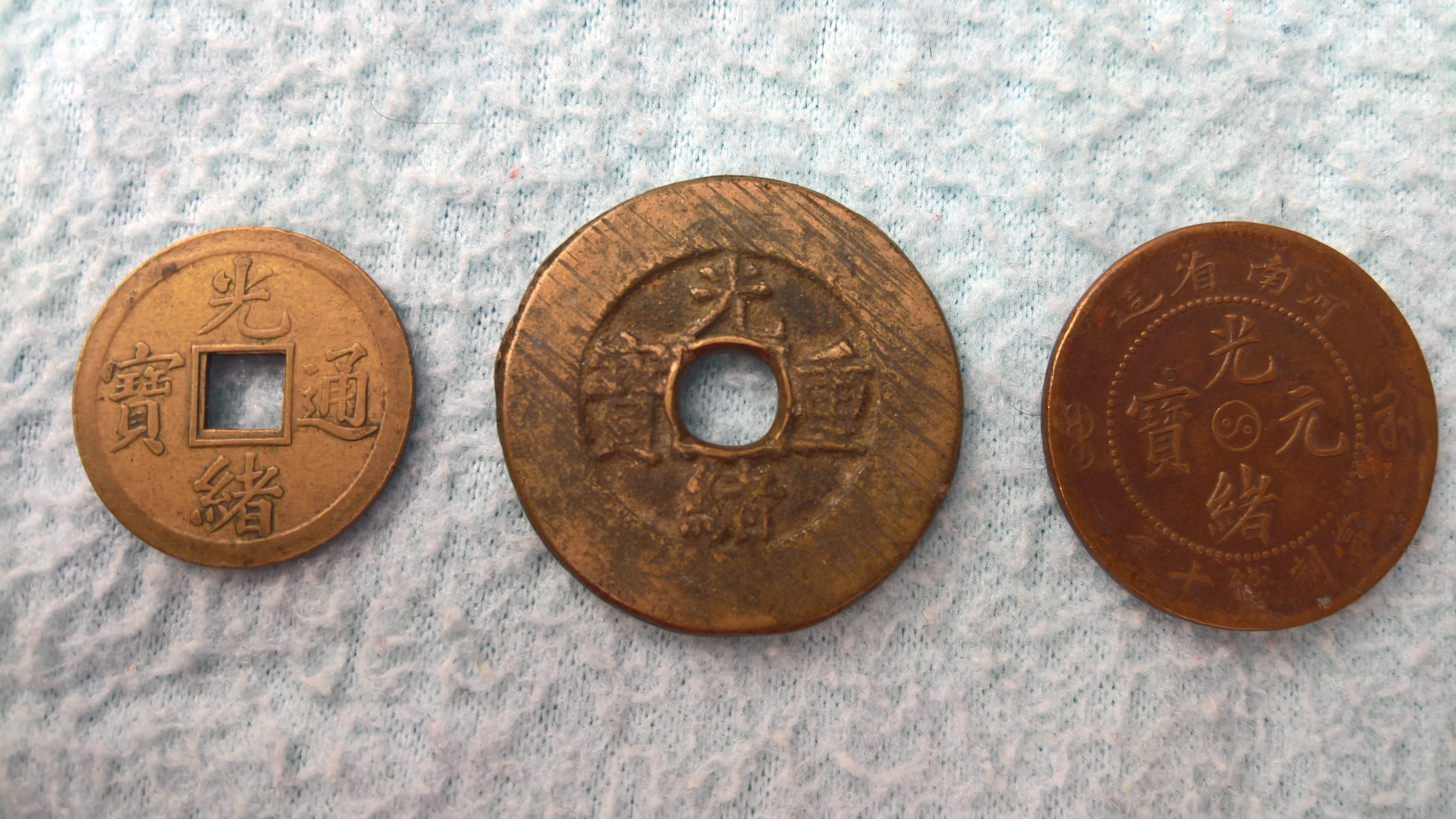
Guāng Xù Tōng Bǎo, Guāng Xù Zhòng Bǎo, and Guāng Xù Yuán Bǎo coins.

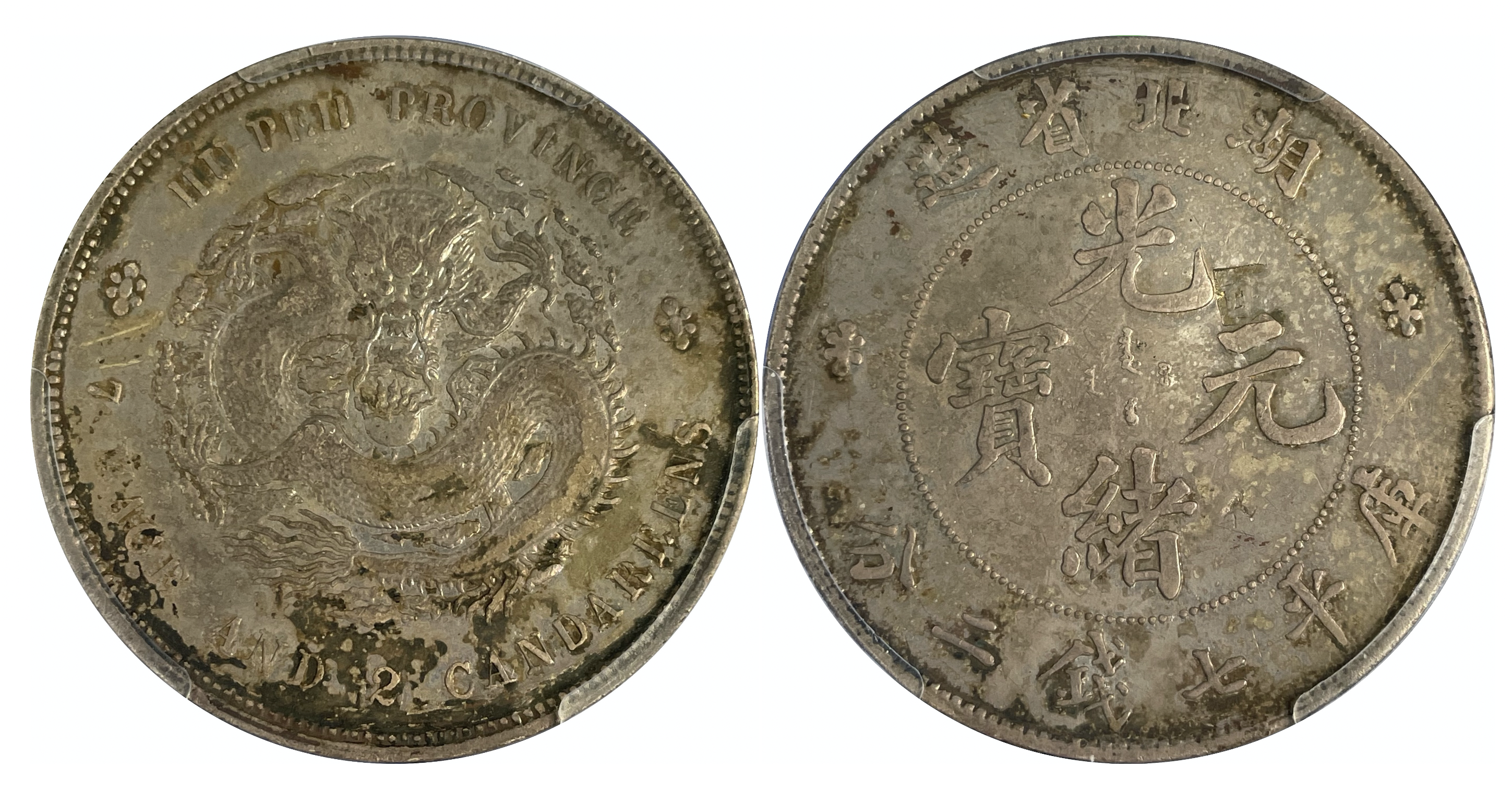
Silver coin: 1 yuan Guangxu, Hupei Province - (1895–1907)

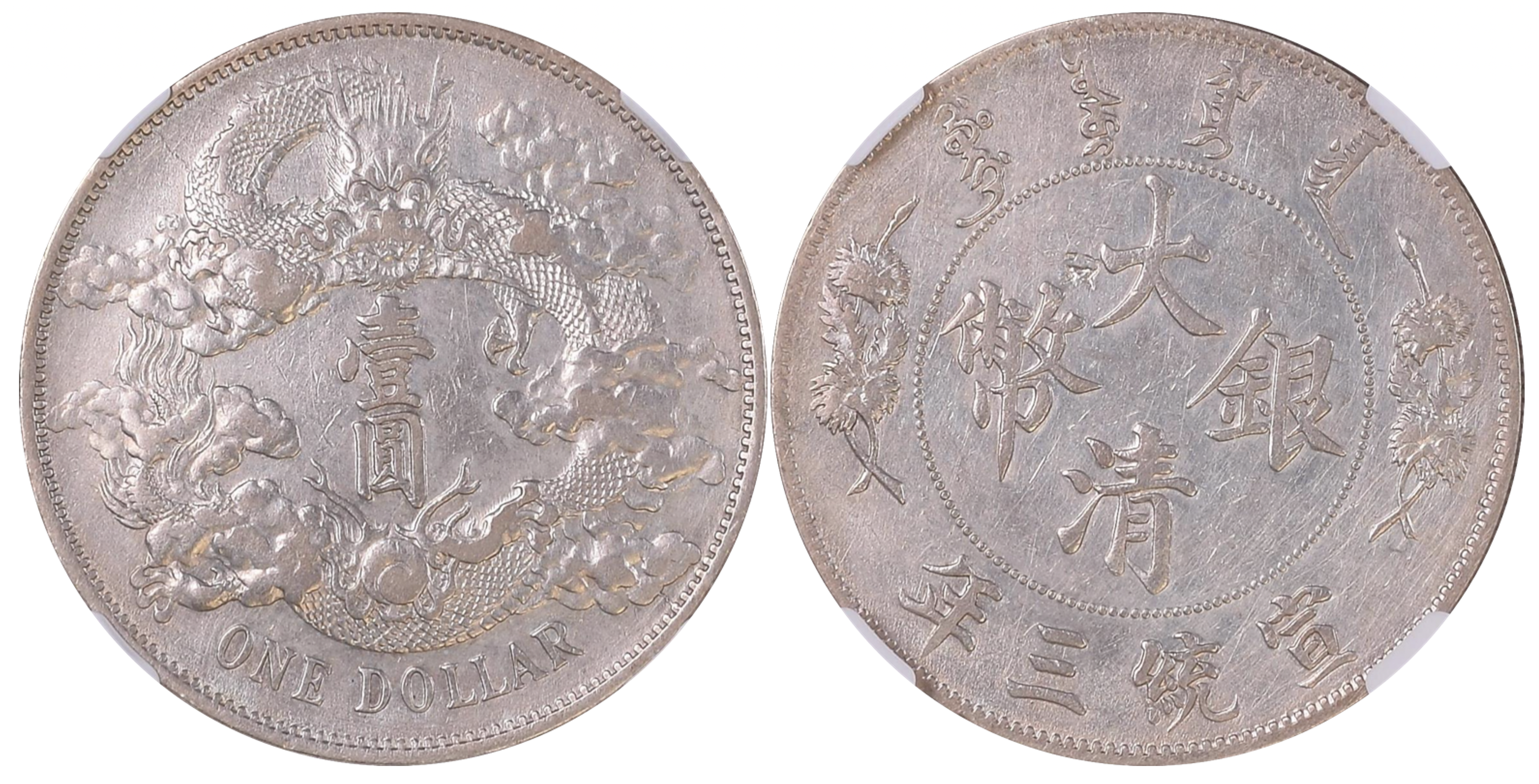
Silver coin: 1 yuan/dollar Xuantong 3rd year - 1911 Chopmark

Late Imperial China maintained both a silver and a copper currency system. The copper system was based on the copper cash (wen). The silver system had several units which by the Qing dynasty were: 1 tael = 10 mace = 100 candareens = 1000 lí (silver cash). By the late 19th century, the Qing dynasty faced a fragmented monetary system in which silver ingots, copper cash (tongqian), and foreign coins circulated simultaneously. This disarray hampered commerce, tax collection, and efforts to integrate the economy into global trade. In response, the Qing government sought to unify the currency system and align it with international norms.

In 1889, the Chinese yuan was introduced at par with the Spanish dollar or Mexican peso or Philippine peso and was subdivided into 10 jiao (角, not given an English name, cf. dime), 100 fen (分, cents), and 1000 wen (文, cash). The yuan was equivalent to 7 mace and 2 candareens (or 0.72 tael) and, for a time, coins were marked as such in English.

A significant step came in 1903 with the introduction of Kuangxu Yuanbao (光绪元宝) coins. Minted in various provinces, these coins represented an early attempt at standardization. However, inconsistencies in weight, design, and issuance authority limited their impact. The government further advanced these efforts in 1910 by adopting a silver standard and issuing the Da Qing Silver Coin (大清银币). This coin, available in denominations of 1 yuan, 5 jiao, and smaller units, featured the imperial dragon emblem as a symbol of authority. Minted to international trade standards, it aimed to facilitate both domestic and international commerce. The edicts surrounding these reforms, such as the 1905 Monetary Regulations, highlighted the Qing government's determination to modernize fiscal governance (Qing Dynasty Monetary Regulations, 1905).

The earliest issues were silver coins produced at the Kwangtung mint in denominations of 5 fen, 1, 2 and 5 jiao and 1 yuan. Other regional mints were opened in the 1890s producing similar coins. Copper coins in denominations of 1, 2, 5, 10 and 20 wen were also issued. The central government began issuing its own coins in the yuan currency system in 1903. Banknotes were issued in yuan denominations from the 1890s by several local and private banks, along with the "Imperial Bank of China" and the "Hu Pu Bank" (later the "Ta-Ch'ing Government Bank"), established by the imperial government.

Despite these ambitious reforms, the Qing dynasty's weakening grip on power, exacerbated by the 1911 revolution, left the currency system fragmented. Regional mints and private banks (qianzhuang) continued to issue diverse forms of currency, perpetuating monetary instability.

== Republic of China ==
The fall of the Qing dynasty and the establishment of the Republic of China in 1912 did little to resolve monetary disarray. Warlords, provincial governments, and foreign powers issued their own currencies, further complicating the financial landscape. Amid this chaos, the Republic sought to assert control over the monetary system through centralized reforms.

The Bank of China (中国银行), founded in 1912, was instrumental in modernizing China's monetary and financial systems during the Republic era. Initially serving as the central bank, it later focused on issuing banknotes and managing foreign exchange. The Bank of China's issuance of its own notes, alongside Fabi, highlighted the dual nature of the monetary system during this period. Despite its contributions to economic modernization, the bank's influence diminished with the rise of centralized monetary control under the Communist government after 1949.

=== Silver coins ===
The Republic of China was founded after the Xinhai Revolution toppled the Qing dynasty. The Nanjing-based Provisional Government of the Republic of China urgently needed to issue military currency for use in place of the previous Qing currency. Successively, each province declared independence from the Qing and issued their own military currency. In 1914, the National Currency Ordinance established the silver dollar as the national currency of the Republic of China. Although designs changed compared with imperial era coins, the sizes and metals used in the coinage remained mostly unchanged until the 1930s. The majority of regional mints closed during the 1920s and 1930s, although some continued until 1949. From 1936, the central government issued copper 1/2, 1 and 2 fen coins, nickel (later cupronickel) 5, 10 and 20 fen and 1/1 yuan coins. Aluminium 1 and 5 fen pieces were issued in 1940.

During most of the Nanjing decade, China's currency was on the silver standard. It was necessary for the Nationalist government's expenses to be balanced by sales of government bonds, tax revenues, and other receipts.

The 1920s and 1930s saw the price of silver appreciate in the international market, increasing the purchasing power of the Chinese currency and leading to a massive efflux of silver out of China. It became evident to the Chinese government that it could not retain the Silver Standard without debt defaults increasing, and so chose to abandon it. The situation was exacerbated by the multitude of commercial, provincial and foreign banks issuing currencies all at different values.

A significant step came in 1903 with the introduction of Kuangxu Yuanbao (光绪元宝) coins. Minted in various provinces, these coins represented an early attempt at standardization. However, inconsistencies in weight, design, and issuance authority limited their impact. The government further advanced these efforts in 1910 by adopting a silver standard and issuing the Da Qing Silver Coin (大清银币). This coin, available in denominations of 1 yuan, 5 jiao, and smaller units, featured the imperial dragon emblem as a symbol of authority. Minted to international trade standards, it aimed to facilitate both domestic and international commerce. The edicts surrounding these reforms, such as the 1905 Monetary Regulations, highlighted the Qing government's determination to modernize fiscal governance.

=== Fabi ===
In 1935, the Nationalist government issued a new currency, the fabi (Chinese: 法幣; pinyin: fǎbì; Wade–Giles: fa-pi), through the four major government controlled banks: the Bank of China, Central Bank of China, Bank of Communications, and the Agricultural Bank of China. H.H. Kung, the Nationalist government's Finance Minister, directed the creation of the fabi. This fiat currency replaced the silver standard. This reform, managed by the Central Reserve Bank, aimed to reduce reliance on silver, which had been subject to international manipulation, particularly by the United States through the Silver Purchase Act of 1934. Official government documents from the reform, such as the Proclamation on the Implementation of the Fabi System (1935), emphasized its goals of stabilizing the currency and fostering economic growth

The Fabi Reform had significant effects: it insulated China from fluctuations in global silver prices and laid the groundwork for a more centralized monetary policy.The reform curtailed the issuance of private and regional currencies, consolidating financial control under the Nationalist government.

No separate institution existed to control the money supply, and therefore the political leadership of the Nationalist government was free to dictate the money supply. When it came to military expenses, Chiang Kai-shek decided how much money he needed and ordered H.H. Kung to supply it.

The onset of World War II saw a sharp devaluation of the fabi currency. This was largely due to the unrestrained issuance of the currency to fund the war effort.

The Nationalist government sought to ensure that the fabi remained convertible into foreign currency and expended large amounts of foreign exchange in an effort to maintain the pre-war exchange rate. This approach became unviable and on March 13, 1938, the Nationalist government imposed strict foreign exchange controls. Foreign banks operating in China could evade most of these controls, however, and continued to move money out of the country.

By October 1938, the Nationalist government lost control of its economic center to the invading Japanese. Military expenditures remained high, but tax revenues plunged. Printing of the fabi sought to cover the difference.

After its 1941 declaration of war against the United States and the United Kingdom, Japan moved into the foreign-controlled areas of Shanghai that it had not previously occupied after its success in the Battle of Shanghai. It seized most of the banks in these areas of Shanghai and declared that fabi within Shanghai and occupied Tianjin had to be exchanged for bank notes of the Wang Jingwei regime. For most Chinese in these occupied areas, the exchange meant that their fabi lost half its value and a major blow to the economy of the lower Yangzi resulted.

The period from the late Qing to the early years of the People's Republic illustrates China's struggle to modernize its monetary system in the face of internal and external challenges. Reforms such as the introduction of the Da Qing Silver Coin, the Fabi system, and ultimately the Renminbi reflect a nation striving for stability and modernization. Each phase of this journey, shaped by political transitions and economic upheaval, contributed to the formation of the unified monetary system that underpins China's contemporary financial strength.

=== Customs gold units ===
Customs gold units (關金圓, pinyin: guānjīnyuán) were issued by the Central Bank of China to facilitate payment of duties on imported goods. Unlike the national currency which suffered from hyperinflation, the CGUs were pegged to the U.S. dollar at 1 CGU = US$0.40.

The peg was removed in 1935 and the bank allowed CGUs to be released for general use. Already awash with excessive paper currency, the CGUs only added to rampant hyperinflation.

=== 1945–1948 ===
After the defeat of Japan in 1945, the Central Bank of China issued a separate currency in the northeast to replace those issued by puppet banks. Termed "東北九省流通券" (pinyin: Dōngběi jiǔ shěng liútōngquàn), it was worth approximately 10 times more than fabi circulating elsewhere. It was replaced in 1948 by the gold yuan. The Northeastern Provinces yuan was an attempt to isolate certain regions of China from the hyperinflation that plagued the fabi currency.

In 1948, the Nationalist government introduced the Gold Yuan (金圆券) as a last-ditch effort to stabilize the economy. Pegged to gold reserves, the Gold Yuan was declared the sole legal tender. However, it failed due to insufficient reserves, mismanagement, and continued political instability. By the time the Nationalist government retreated to Taiwan, the monetary system on the mainland was in shambles.

=== Gold yuan ===
In response to hyperinflation, the Nationalist government issued the gold yuan in August 1948. The Gold Yuan Certificate replaced the fabi at the rate of 1 gold yuan = 3 million yuan fabi = US$0.25. The gold yuan was nominally set at 222.17 milligrams (1/140 ozt) of gold. Despite the implication of "gold" yuan, the currency was not backed by gold.

The gold yuan failed with greater speed than the fabi had. The gold yuan regulations had required citizens to surrender their gold and silver. When these regulations were abandoned, people who had complied with the regulations suffered huge losses while those who had violated the regulations and hoarded gold and silver avoided this harm. As hyperinflation continued after the gold yuan's failure, Chinese increasingly avoided currency and increasingly exchanged goods via barter.

In 1948, the Nationalist government introduced the Gold Yuan (金圆券) as a last-ditch effort to stabilize the economy. Pegged to gold reserves, the Gold Yuan was declared the sole legal tender. However, it failed due to insufficient reserves, mismanagement, and continued political instability (Von Glahn 1996, 310). By the time the Nationalist government retreated to Taiwan, the monetary system on the mainland was in shambles.

The Bank of China (中国银行), founded in 1912, was instrumental in modernizing China's monetary and financial systems during the Republic era. Initially serving as the central bank, it later focused on issuing banknotes and managing foreign exchange. The Bank of China's issuance of its own notes, alongside Fabi, highlighted the dual nature of the monetary system during this period.

Despite its contributions to economic modernization, the bank's influence diminished with the rise of centralized monetary control under the Communist government after 1949.

=== 1949–2001 ===
Finally, in 1949, the Kuomintang again announced a reform with the introduction of the Silver Yuan Certificate, returning China to the silver standard. The silver yuan would be exchanged at 1 silver yuan = 100 million gold yuan, and was backed by silver dollars minted by the Central Mint of China.

This currency was short-lived, as the Chinese Communist Party soon gained control of the Mainland provinces. It was replaced by currency issued by the People's Bank of China which was less prone to inflation.

After the retreat of the Kuomintang to Taiwan, the silver yuan remained the de jure legal currency of account of the Republic of China, although only Taiwan dollars issued by the Bank of Taiwan were circulating in areas controlled by the ROC. After a currency reform in 1949 created the New Taiwan dollar, the statutory exchange rate was set at 1 silver yuan = NT$3.

An amendment was passed in 2000 to make the New Taiwan dollar the official legal currency of the Republic of China.

=== Taiwan dollar ===
The Bank of Taiwan was originally established by the Japanese in 1899 whilst Taiwan was under Japanese administration. The bank issued Taiwanese yen which were pegged to the Japanese yen. After the retrocession of Taiwan to the Republic of China, the new Bank of Taiwan was allowed to continue issuing its own currency. Called the "Taiwan dollar", it replaced the Taiwanese yen at par. This was an attempt by the Kuomintang to prevent the hyperinflation affecting the mainland from affecting Taiwan.

However, mismanagement by the governor-general Chen Yi meant that the Taiwan dollar also suffered depreciation. It was replaced by the New Taiwan dollar in 1949 at the rate of 40,000 to 1.

== Japanese occupation money ==
The Japanese Imperial Government issued currency through several means during their occupation of China.

=== Manchuria ===
At the time of invasion of China's northeast in 1931, multiple currencies were circulating. These included local provincial issues, the Kuomintang fabi and yen currencies issued by the Bank of Chōsen and the Bank of Taiwan.

After the puppet state of Manchukuo was created, the Japanese founded the Central Bank of Manchou on July 1, 1932, in Changchun (長春), then known as Xinjing (新京). While the bank provided commercial functions, it also acted as a central bank and issuer of currency. The Manchukuo yuan was initially set at 1 Manchukuo yuan = 23.91 g silver, but became pegged to the Japanese yen at 1:1 in 1935 after Japan left the gold standard. The currency lasted until the end of World War II. It was replaced by the Northeastern Provinces Yuan issued by the Central Bank of China.

=== Inner Mongolia ===
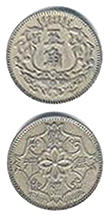
A 5 Jiao Coin issued in 1938 by the Bank of Mengjiang.

Before Japanese occupation, the predominant bank of China's northern provinces (including Suiyuan, Chahar and Shanxi) was the Charhar Commercial Bank. When the Japanese invaded, the bank evacuated the area taking all of its capital and all unissued currency. The Japanese military government quickly established the Channan Commercial Bank to replace its note issuing functions.

With the formation of Mengjiang puppet state, the authorities established the Bank of Mengjiang which amalgamated the Channan Commercial Bank with three other smaller regional banks. The Bank of Mengjiang issued Mengjiang yuan from 1937 which was pegged to the Japanese military yen and Japanese yen at par.

=== Collaborationist governments ===
The Japanese managed to establish two collaborationist regimes during their occupation in China. In the north, the "Provisional Government of China" (中華民國臨時政府) based in Beijing established the Federal Reserve Bank of China (中國聯合準備銀行, pinyin: Zhōngguó Liánhé Zhǔnbèi Yínháng). The FRB issued notes in 1938 at par with Kuomintang fabi. Although initially equivalent, the Japanese banned the use of Nationalist currency in 1939 and set arbitrary exchange rates in favour of the FRB yuan. The FRB yuan was replaced by Kuomintang fabi in 1945 at 5 FRB yuan = 1 fabi.

The Wang Jingwei government in Nanjing established the collaborationist Nanjing Reformed Government (南京維新政府) in 1938. This was later reorganized into the Nanjing National Government (南京國民政府) in 1940. They established the Central Reserve Bank of China (中央儲備銀行, pinyin: Zhōngyāng Chǔbèi Yínháng) which began issuing CRB yuan in 1941. Although initially set at par with the Nationalist fabi, it also was arbitrarily changed to equal 0.18 Japanese military yen. In 1945, the collaborationist regime's currency was also replaced by the Nationalist fabi at 200 CRB yuan = 1 fabi.

News of the 9 July 1943 Allied invasion of Sicily prompted the Chinese public to unload their collaborationist regime currency. The prices of gold, Chinese stock, real estate, and commodities increased rapidly.

=== Japanese military yen ===
The Japanese military yen was distributed in many regions throughout East Asia under Japanese occupation. Initially, these were issued as payment to soldiers. The intention was the payout of an indefinite amount of Japanese military yen which could not be converted into Japanese yen and therefore could not cause inflation in Japan. However, the destructive effects on local East Asian economies was not a major concern.

The currency became legal tender in China commencing in 1937. It was later replaced by issues from puppet banks. However, the currency remained in force in Hong Kong between 1941 and 1945. Initially set at HK$2 = JMY1, the Hong Kong dollar was largely preferred by locals and hoarded away. In order to address this, the Japanese government made possession of Hong Kong dollars illegal in 1943 and required a conversion to JMY at 4 to 1.

=== Following Japanese surrender ===
In the period immediately following the Japanese surrender in the Second Sino-Japanese War, the formerly occupied areas had competing currencies. Japan had never unified the currency systems in the areas it occupied, thus the Wang Jingwei regime, the Wang Kemin regime, and the Manchukuo puppet state all had separate currency systems. The Nationalist government attempted to replace these currencies with the fabi. For the currency of the Wang Jingwei regime, the Nationalist government set a minimal exchange rate of 200 yuan in regime currency to one fabi and required the regime currency to be exchanged within four months. This undervaluation made inflation worse as Chinese who formerly lived under the regime rushed to hoard goods rather than exchange for fabi which in turn drove price increases. Ultimately, the unrealistic exchange rate impoverished those who had lived under the Wang Jingwei regime and made economic revival of the area more difficult. The Nationalist government set more realistic exchange rates for the Wang Kemin and Manchukuo regime currencies.

== People's Republic of China ==
The establishment of the People's Republic of China in 1949 marked a turning point in the nation's monetary history. The Communist government introduced the Renminbi (人民币) as the sole legal tender, effectively unifying the fragmented currency system. Issued and regulated by the newly formed People's Bank of China (中国人民银行), the Renminbi brought much-needed stability to a war-torn economy.

The centralized monetary system established under the RMB laid the foundation for economic recovery and development. It also symbolized the Communist government's ability to consolidate power and implement effective fiscal policies, paving the way for China's modern financial governance.

China's monetary system has not witnessed any major developments until the late 1970s. These transformations called for massive changes from a centrally controlled planned economy which started in 1978 until now when China transformed into a more market oriented economy. The leaders at the time perceived that some form of liberalization and competition would take the economy to much greater heights. However, this integrated reform process was not successful, but had effect on numerous processes over a period of time. One of these included the view that the private sector should gradually be allowed to play a bigger role in pricing, lend resources, and manage businesses. Others believed that foreign owned businesses should be allowed to operate alongside private businesses, and that foreign investment could be brought gradually. These policies over time, altered the relationship between the people in terms of commercial activities and the way money was assigned throughout the country. They also provided the necessary conditions for China to interact with international investors and financial institutions. It was in this situation that the Chinese government decided to remonetize the Shanghai Stock Exchange in 1990, and in February 1991 the Shenzhen Stock Exchange was established. These stock market operations played a critical role in the reintroduction of stock markets to the country after nearly a century of disruption and signaled an end to the hitherto isolation. By the start of the 1990s, Chinese stock markets began to open and allow the inflow of foreign capital, as well as international business, which facilitated the growth of local businesses and a beneficial development of resources allocation mechanism.

=== Renminbi ===
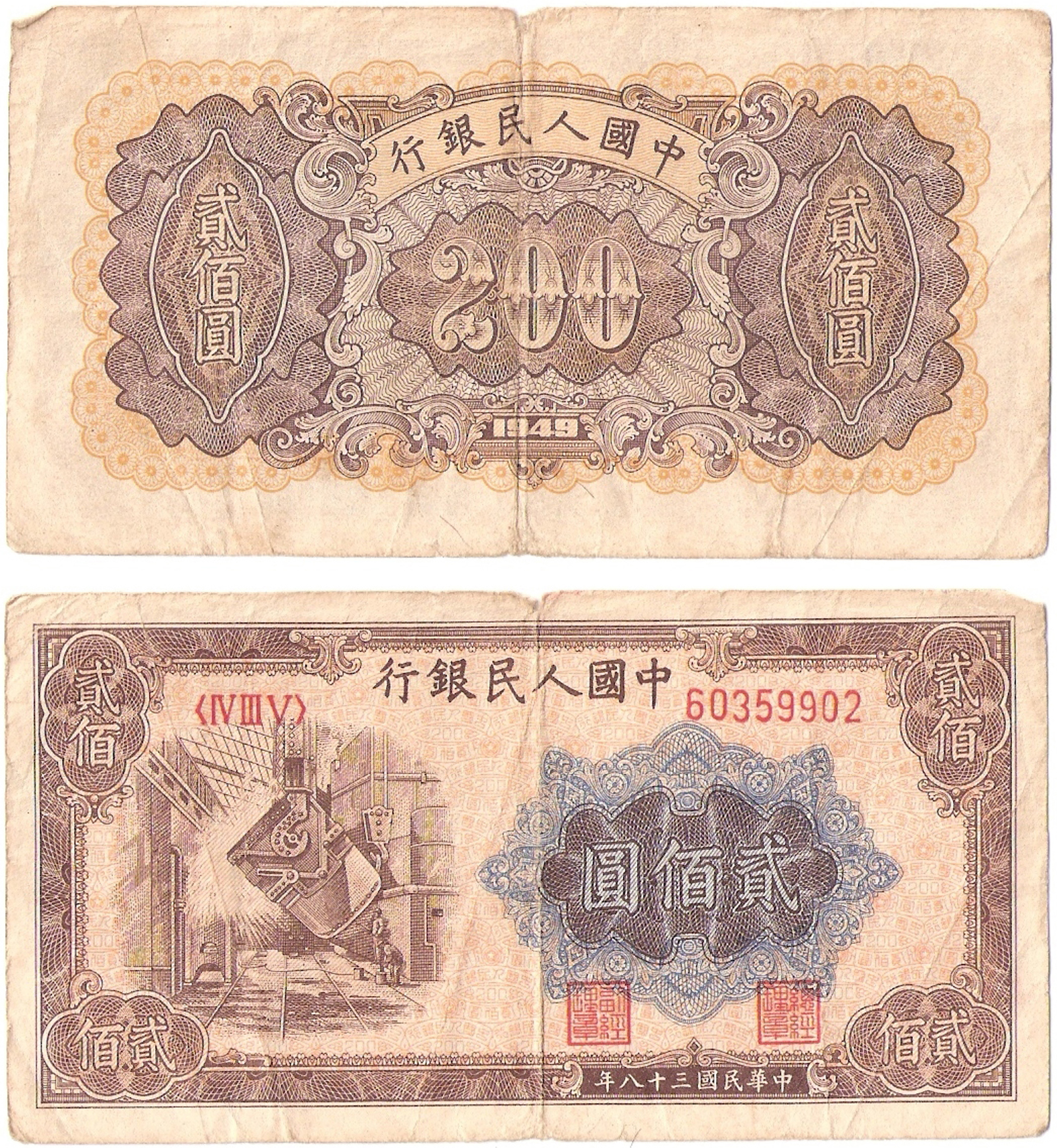
A RMB200 note issued by the People's Bank of China in 1949.

The Chinese Communist Party gained control of large areas of the northeast of China during 1948 and 1949. Although several regional banks were established, they were united in December 1948 as the People's Bank of China. Established in Shijiazhuang, the new bank took over currency issuance in areas controlled by the Communist Party.

After the promulgation of the People's Republic of China, there was a brief period where 100,000 gold yuan could be exchanged for 1 yuan Renminbi.

Renminbi notes were issued in 12 denominations: 1, 5, 10, 20, 50, 100, 200, 500, 1000, 5000, 10,000, and 50,000 yuan. These denominations were subdivided into 62 styles. After adjusting the currency value with ratio 1:10,000 in March 1955, the second edition of Renminbi were issued in 12 denominations, including 1 fen, 2 fen, 5 fen, 1 jiao, 2 jiao, 5 jiao, 1 yuan, 2 yuan, 3 yuan, 5 yuan and 10 yuan.

The People's Republic of China began issuing aluminum coins in December 1957, in denominations of 1, 2 and 5 fen. From 1961, China outsourced the printing of 3, 5 and 10 yuan notes to the Soviet Union.

The fifth and latest editions of the currency of the People's Republic of China have been produced since 1 October 1999. Notes have been produced in 8 denominations: old types of 1 fen, 2 fen and 5 fen, as well as new issues depicting Mao Zedong: 5 yuan, 10 yuan, 20 yuan, 50 yuan and 100 yuan. In 2004, a 1 yuan note depicting Mao Zedong first came into production. Since 1999, coins have been produced in denominations of 1 fen, 2 fen, 5 fen, 1 jiao, 5 jiao and 1 yuan.

With the deepening of China's stock markets, the authorities were more concerned with the international position of the renminbi (RMB). Despite an impressive boost in economic development, as well as the increasing globalization of trade turnover, the RMB was tightly controlled because of currency restrictions and was not in the group of strong currencies like the US dollar and the euro. Policymakers appreciated however, that they had to change the foreign perceptions of China in order to increase its standing in the global economic system, which meant increasing the use and recognition of the RMB outside China. This shift in the policy led the government and the People's Bank of China (PBOC) to adopt a strategic approach to the process of internationalization of the RMB. Over the years, a series of bilateral currency swap agreements, more flexible exchange rate mechanisms, and open RMB markets contributed to slowly broadening the currency's use in cross-border transactions. While these measures alone did not bring the instant prominence, they were critical steps in a longer-term plan designed to enhance the RMB's appeal.

In 2016, the significant step forward took place when the International Monetary Fund (IMF) included the RMB in its basket of currencies for Special Drawing Rights (SDRs) alongside the US dollar, Euro, British pound, and the Japanese yen. By 2022, its weight within this basket had risen to 10.92% indicating the currency's increased relevance in the international monetary system. However, this inclusion was largely endorsing a political process as it didn't change the true state about the usage of the formers, it greatly increased the status of the Chinese yuan. However, as the international acceptance of the currency increased not all concerns were eliminated. Many international investors and central banks had thoughts especially with regard to the conversion of different currencies, the level of disclosure available and the political climate in China. However, the gradual procedure of the internationalization of the RMB showed Beijing's intention to expand engagement with developed economies, but on its own terms.

=== Foreign Exchange Certificates ===
The Bank of China on the mainland was chartered as the main foreign trade and exchange bank. Foreign visitors to the People's Republic of China were required to conduct transactions with Foreign Exchange Certificates issued by the Bank of China between 1979 and 1994. These have been abolished, and all transactions now occur in Renminbi.

=== Transition from cash to mobile payment ===
As the importance of RMB increased at the global level, another process began to change the internal financial system of the People's Republic of China. Starting in the late 2000s, the expansion of the internet and the general trend of having smartphones in the hands of citizens made it possible to develop platforms for digital payments. Such companies as Alipay and Wechat Pay provided opportunities to Chinese buyers to skip traditional banking systems and directly go to mobile transactions. In just a few years, cash and credit cards started to lose importance in a number of situations in cities, and as per 2020, in over 90% of cases in China urban areas, cashless transactions were reported. Such phenomenal development not only made business simpler but also increased accessibility to demographics that had less prominence in formal banking systems. The triumph of these payment systems legitimized the recognition of digital finance by the government as a new frontier, which would lead not only to the improvement of domestic productivity, but even to the construction of global norms in the long perspective.

The central government then changed focus from the level of private-sector innovation, going one step ahead: to start releasing a central bank digital currency. For the first time, this currency appeared in a 2019 pilot program. This move was seen as a step in retaining some similarity of sovereignty over the fast-changing landscape of digital payments, ensuring that policies enacted to enhance the monetary system me wider objectives, including financial stability and wider access. Creation of the e-CNY may have possible consequences in international monetary relations. Although at the beginning, e-CNY may overcome such inefficiencies of the payment and payment systems of cross-border payments. This is unique in that the digital currency is an issue of the state, not of the private sector, which normally would rely on a multiplicity of partnerships that can be unstable. As per the People's Bank of China, the main motive for e-CNY was to substitute home-based transactions with a more reliable and controlled digital transaction system targeting both domestic and international consumers.

The digital RMB will go together with the increasing urge by China to internationalize the RMB. If the e-CNY were to go across borders, there would be less dependence on the few currencies that dominate the international currency arena. But there are also question marks: Everything from the reaction of other governments, via regulation, to whether international financial systems were primed or if there is any comparative advantage in using e-CNY when trading openly would go into deciding the timing of a global boom of the E-CNY. While the details remain limited, analysts still believe that the rush with which other countries are going about CBDC does offer a window of opportunity for China over a few norms in setting global digital currency systems.

China's monetary system since the 1978 economic reforms has evolved through gradual changes rather than drastic action. Initial reforms included the decentralization in planning and the establishment of stock markets to facilitate foreign investment. The international role of the Renminbi (RMB) has expanded further with its inclusion in the IMF's Special Drawing Rights (SDR) basket in 2016. Domestically, widespread adoption of digital payment platforms has shifted daily commerce towards cashless transactions, followed by the central bank's pilot testing and rollout of the digital yuan (e-CNY).

Before 2010, consumer purchases with anything other than physical currency was rare, although in the 2000s some large urban shops and international hotels began to accept credit cards. China leapfrogged credit card payments to become one of the world's leaders in mobile payments. Early and wide adoption of mobile payments also led to a boom in online shopping and retail banking.

== See also ==
- Chinese Silver Panda
- Economic history of China
- List of Chinese cash coins by inscription
- History of monetary policy in China

English	Chinese (Hanzi)
Dai Jianbing (1993). Modern Chinese Paper Money. China Financial Publishing House, Beijing.	戴建兵：《中国近代纸币》，中国金融出版社1993年版。 OCLC 30513635
Dai Jianbing (1994). Modern Chinese Commercial Bank Paper Money. China Financial Publishing House, Beijing.	戴建兵：《中國近代商業銀行纸币》，中国金融出版社1994年版。
