= Shanghai Mint =

Shanghai Mint refers to:

- Central Mint, originally named "Shanghai Mint", in Taiwan.
- Shanghai Mint, in Shanghai, People's Republic of China.
