= Old Taiwan dollar =

Former currency of Taiwan

舊臺幣 (Chinese)

Unit
- Unit: yuan (圓)
- Plural: The language(s) of this currency do(es) not have a morphological plural distinction.
- Symbol: TW$

Denominations
- Banknotes: 1, 5, 10, 50, 100, 500, 1000, 5000, 10000, 100000, 1000000 dollars

Demographics
- Date of introduction: 1946
- Replaced: Taiwanese yen
- Date of withdrawal: 1949
- Replaced by: New Taiwan dollar
- User(s): Taiwan Province, Republic of China

Issuance
- Central bank: Bank of Taiwan
- Website: www.bot.com.tw
- Printer: China Engraving and Printing Works
- Website: www.cepp.gov.tw

Valuation
- Value: TW$40,000 = NT$1
- This infobox shows the latest status before this currency was rendered obsolete.

Old Taiwan dollar
- Traditional Chinese: 舊臺幣
- Simplified Chinese: 旧台币
Transcriptions
Standard Mandarin
- Hanyu Pinyin: Jiùtáibì
Hakka
- Pha̍k-fa-sṳ: Khìu-thòi-pi
Southern Min
- Hokkien POJ: Kū-tâi-pē
- Tâi-lô: Kū-tâi-pē

The Old Taiwan dollar was in use from 1946 to 1949, beginning shortly after Taiwan's handover from Japan to the Republic of China. The currency was issued by the Bank of Taiwan. Hyperinflation prompted the introduction of the New Taiwan dollar in June 1949, shortly before the Nationalist evacuation from mainland China in December.

== History ==
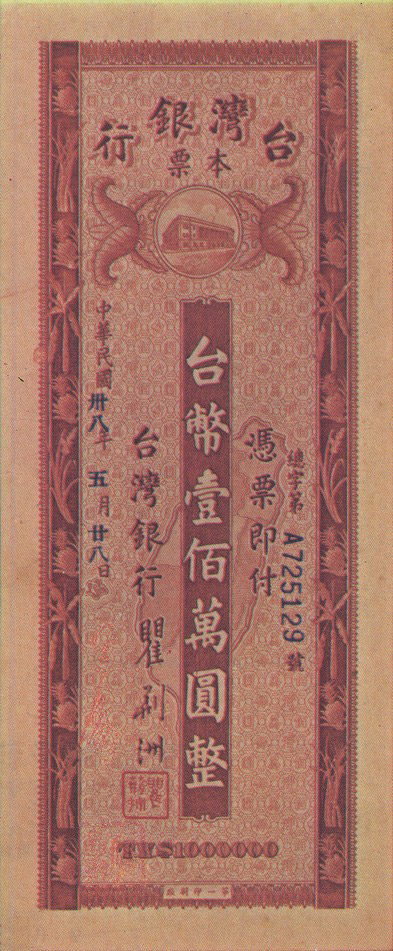
Bearer's check of 1,000,000 Taiwan Dollars (TW$1,000,000) issued by the Bank of Taiwan. Hyperinflation led authorities to issue bearer's checks denominated at one million dollars in 1948.

Taiwan was under Japanese rule from 1895 to 1945 and the colonial government of Taiwan issued Taiwanese yen during this period through the Bank of Taiwan. In 1945, after the Japanese Empire was defeated in World War II, Taiwan was handed over to the Republic of China (ROC). Within a year, the Nationalist government assumed control of the Bank of Taiwan and issued Taiwan dollars (also known as Taiwan Nationalist yuan or TWN) as a "provisional" replacement for the Taiwan yen at the rate of one to one. The new banknotes were initially printed in Shanghai, and were shipped to Taipei. After the Nationalists consolidated their control over Taiwan the banknotes were printed in Taipei. The currency was not subdivided (no cents), and no coins were issued.

Due to the Chinese Civil War in the late 1940s, Taiwan, like the rest of mainland China, suffered from hyperinflation. As inflation worsened, the government issued banknotes at higher and higher denominations, up to one million yuan. Because the inflation of the Taiwan dollar was only a side effect of the inflation of the then Chinese yuan of mainland China, it depreciated at a slower rate than the currency used on the mainland.

The Taiwan dollar was replaced by the New Taiwan dollar on 15 June 1949, at the rate of 1 new dollar to 40,000 old dollars. The Nationalists were defeated by the Communists in December of the same year and retreated to Taiwan. The government then declared in the Temporary Provisions Effective During the Period of Communist Rebellion that dollars issued by the Bank of Taiwan would become the new currency in circulation.

== Banknotes ==
The denominations of the Old Taiwan dollar in circulation were:

Orientation	Value	Dimensions	Main Color	Description		Date of	
Orientation	Value	Dimensions	Main Color	Obverse	Reverse	printing	issue
Horizontal Style Banknotes	1 dollar	130 × 70 mm	Blue	Sun Yat-sen, Bank of Taiwan, map of Taiwan	Naval Battle Against the Dutch	1946	22 May 1946
Horizontal Style Banknotes	5 dollars	135 × 73 mm	Red	Sun Yat-sen, Bank of Taiwan, map of Taiwan	Naval Battle Against the Dutch	1946	22 May 1946
Horizontal Style Banknotes	10 dollars	141 × 77 mm	Green-Gray	Sun Yat-sen, Bank of Taiwan, map of Taiwan	Naval Battle Against the Dutch	1946	22 May 1946
Horizontal Style Banknotes	50 dollars	144 × 77 mm	Brown	Sun Yat-sen, Bank of Taiwan, map of Taiwan	Naval Battle Against the Dutch	1946	1 September 1946
Horizontal Style Banknotes	100 dollars	154 × 82 mm	Green	Sun Yat-sen, Bank of Taiwan, map of Taiwan	Naval Battle Against the Dutch	1946	1 September 1946
Horizontal Style Banknotes	500 dollars	158 × 84 mm	Red	Sun Yat-sen, Bank of Taiwan, map of Taiwan	Naval Battle Against the Dutch	1946	17 May 1948
Horizontal Style Banknotes	100 dollars	154 × 81 mm	Green	Sun Yat-sen, Bank of Taiwan, map of Taiwan	Naval Battle Against the Dutch	1947	1 February 1948
Horizontal Style Banknotes	1000 dollars	158 × 86 mm	Blue-Gray	Sun Yat-sen, Bank of Taiwan, map of Taiwan	Naval Battle Against the Dutch	1948	17 May 1948
Horizontal Style Banknotes	1000 dollars	158 × 86 mm	Blue-Gray	Sun Yat-sen, Bank of Taiwan, map of Taiwan, Sugarcane	Naval Battle Against the Dutch	1948	17 August 1948
Horizontal Style Banknotes	10 000 dollars	160 × 86 mm	Dark Green	Sun Yat-sen, Bank of Taiwan, map of Taiwan, Sugarcane	Naval Battle Against the Dutch	1948	11 December 1948
Horizontal Style Banknotes	10 000 dollars	143 × 67 mm	Red	Sun Yat-sen, map of Taiwan	Bank of Taiwan	1949	17 May 1949
Horizontal Style Banknotes	100 000 dollars	146 × 63 mm	Red	Sun Yat-sen, map of Taiwan	Bank of Taiwan	1949	Never
Vertical Style Bearer's Checks	5000 dollars	60 × 147 mm	Orange	Bank of Taiwan	None (unifaced)	None	3 May 1948
Vertical Style Bearer's Checks	10 000 dollars	61 × 150 mm	Blue	Bank of Taiwan	None (unifaced)	None	1 June 1948
Vertical Style Bearer's Checks	100 000 dollars	61 × 150 mm	Red	Bank of Taiwan	None (unifaced)	None	3 September 1948
Vertical Style Bearer's Checks	1 000 000 dollars	61 × 150 mm	Red-Brown	Bank of Taiwan	None (unifaced)	None	December 1948

== See also ==
- Economy of Taiwan
- History of Taiwan
- History of the Republic of China
- Political status of Taiwan
- New Taiwan dollar

Preceded by: Taiwan yen Reason: Administration of Taiwan transferred to Republic of China; Ratio: at par	Currency of Taiwan Province, Republic of China; 1946 – 1949; Note: Taiwan dollar was initially intended to be a temporary and local currency	Succeeded by: New Taiwan dollar Reason: inflation Ratio: 1 new dollar = 40,000 old dollars
