= Central Engraving and Printing Plant =

- Native name: 中央印製廠
- Romanized name: Zhōngyāng Yìnzhìchǎng (Mandarin); Tiong-iong Ìn-chè-chhiúⁿ (Taiwanese); Tûng-ông Yin-chṳ-chhóng (Hakka)
- Formerly: China Engraving and Printing Works
- Type: State-owned
- Founded: 1 February 1941 (in Chongqing); 1949 (in Taipei)
- Parent: Central Bank of the Republic of China (Taiwan)
- Website: www.cepp.gov.tw

The Central Engraving and Printing Plant (CEPP; Chinese: 中央印製廠; pinyin: Zhōngyāng Yìnzhìchǎng; Pe̍h-ōe-jī: Tiong-iong Ìn-chè-chhiúⁿ), known in English before 2003 as the China Engraving and Printing Works (CEPW), is a subsidiary of the Central Bank of the Republic of China (Taiwan). It is responsible for printing the paper bank notes of Taiwan in its currency, the New Taiwan dollar.

== History ==
The company was established in Chongqing on 1 February 1941. After 1945, it was relocated to Shanghai and a plant was established in Beijing. In 1949, the company was relocated again to Taiwan in Sanchong Township, Taipei County. In 1964, it was relocated to Xindian Township.

== Plants ==
- Ankang Working Site
- Chingtan Working Site

== Organizational structures ==
- Technical Research and Development Division
- Quality Assurance Division
- Occupational Safety and Health Division
- Information Management Office
- Secretariat
- Accounting Office
- Personnel Office
- Procurement and Supply Division
- Ethics Office

== Products ==
Banknotes of New Taiwan dollar printed by the plant are NT$100 note, NT$200 note, NT$500 note, NT$1000 note and NT$2000 note. It also prints certificates such as the Republic of China passports, Exit & Entry Permits, visas, National Identification Cards, land title certificates, diplomas, marriage and divorce certificates, postage stamps, shopping vouchers, postal gift coupons, wine labels, checks, bonds, etc.

== See also ==
- Central Bank of the Republic of China (Taiwan)
- Central Mint
