= Taiwanese yen =

Currency of Japanese Taiwan (1895–1946)

圓 (Japanese)
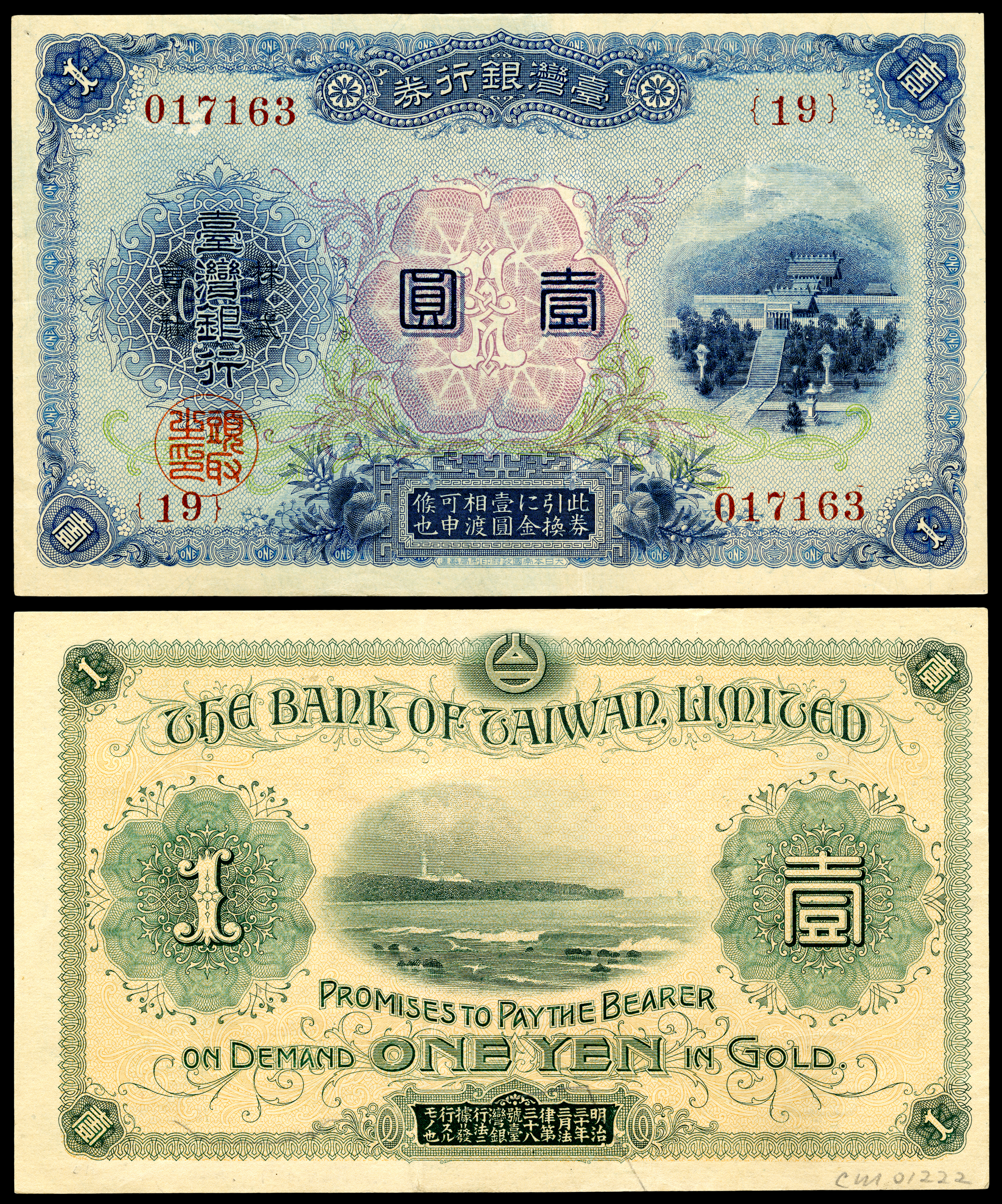
- 1 yen banknote

Units of account
- Subunit
- 1/100: sen (錢)

Demographics
- Date of introduction: 1895
- Date of withdrawal: 1946
- Replaced by: Old Taiwan dollar
- User(s): Taiwan

Issuance
- Central bank: Bank of Taiwan

Valuation
- Value: 1 yen = TW$1
- This infobox shows the latest status before this currency was rendered obsolete.

The Taiwanese yen (Japanese: 圓, Hepburn: en) was the currency of Japanese Taiwan from 1895 to 1946. It was on a par with and circulated alongside the Japanese yen. The yen was subdivided into 100 sen (錢). It was replaced by the Old Taiwan dollar in 1946, which in turn was replaced by the New Taiwan dollar in 1949.

== History ==
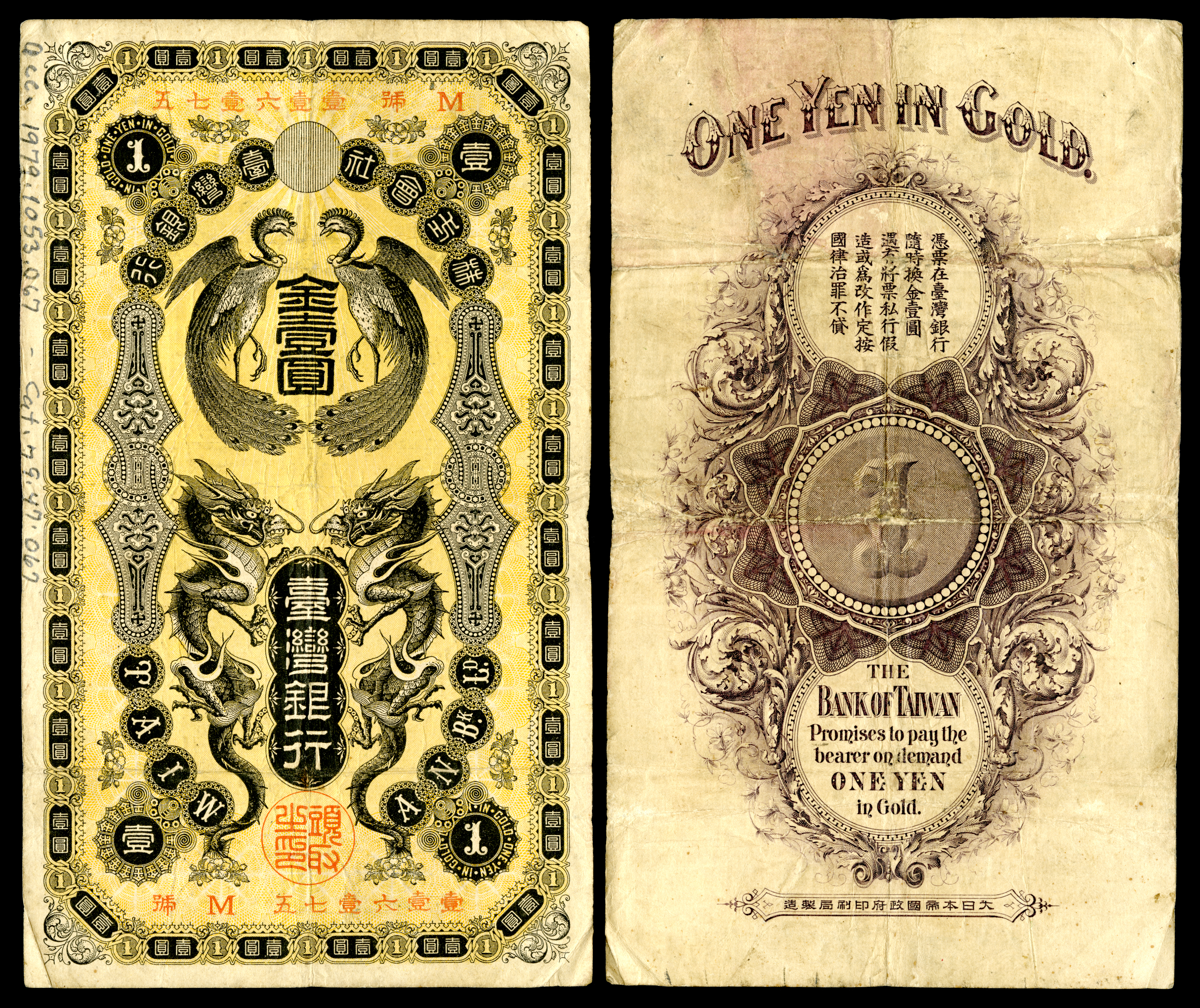
1904 one-yen banknote

In 1895, as a result of the First Sino-Japanese War, Qing China ceded Taiwan to Japan in the Treaty of Shimonoseki. The Japanese yen then became the currency of Taiwan, with distinct banknotes denominated in yen issued by the Bank of Taiwan from 1898. Only banknotes and stamp currency were issued.

In 1945, after Japan was defeated in World War II, the Republic of China assumed the administration of Taiwan, took over the Bank of Taiwan within a year, and introduced the Old Taiwan dollar, which replaced the yen at par.

== Banknotes ==
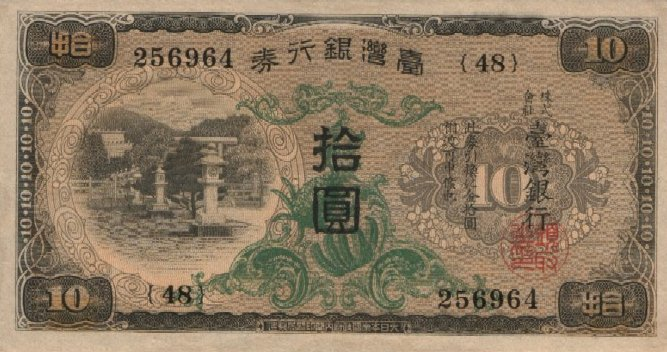
1932 ten-yen banknote

In 1899, the Bank of Taiwan introduced 1 and 5 yen notes, followed by 50 yen notes in 1900 and 10 yen in 1901. 100 yen notes were introduced in 1937 and 1000 yen in 1945. The last notes issued were dated 1945.

== Stamp currency ==
In 1917, stamp currency was issued in denominations of 5, 10, 20, and 50 sen. 1, 3 and 5 sen stamp currency was issued in 1918. These issues consisted of postage stamps of the appropriate denomination fixed to forms called tokubetsu yubin kitte daishi ("special postage stamp cards").

== See also ==
- Meiji Tsuho
- Tael
- New Taiwan Dollar
- Yuan
- Old Taiwan dollar
- History of Taiwan
- History of the Republic of China

Preceded by: Coinages and paper money of the Qing dynasty Reason: Taiwan ceded to Empire of Japan	Currency of Taiwan of Empire of Japan; 1899 – 1946; Note: introduced at 1 Taiwanese yen = 1 Japanese yen	Succeeded by: Old Taiwan dollar Reason: Administration of Taiwan transferred to Republic of China; Ratio: at par
