= New Taiwan dollar =

Currency of Taiwan

新臺幣 (Note: In local languages: Traditional Chinese script: 新臺幣; Mandarin Pinyin: Xīntáibì; Hokkien: Sin-tâi-pè; Sixian Hakka: Sîn-thòi-pi)

ISO 4217
- Code: TWD (numeric: 901)
- Subunit: 0.01

Units of account
- Base unit: yuan (圓)
- Plural: The language(s) of this currency do(es) not have a morphological plural distinction.
- Symbol: NT$, 元, $
- Nickname: Mandarin: 元 (yuán), 塊 (kuài); Hokkien: 箍 (kho͘ ) Hakka: 銀 (ngiùn)
- Subunit
- 1/10: Jiǎo (角)
- 1/100: Fēn (分); Subunits used only in stocks and currency transactions, and are rarely referred to
- Nickname
- Jiǎo (角): Mandarin: 毛 (máo); Hokkien: 角 (kak); Hakka: 角 (kok)
- Fēn (分): Hokkien: 仙 (sian); Hakka: 仙 (siên)

Denominations
- Banknotes
- Freq. used: $100, $500, $1,000
- Rarely used: $200, $2,000
- Coins
- Freq. used: $1, $5, $10, $50
- Rarely used: $0.5, $20

Demographics
- Date of introduction: 15 June 1949
- Replaced: Old Taiwan dollar
- User(s): Republic of China

Issuance
- Central bank: Central Bank of the Republic of China (Taiwan)
- Website: www.cbc.gov.tw
- Printer: Central Engraving and Printing Plant
- Website: www.cepp.gov.tw
- Mint: Central Mint
- Website: www.cmc.gov.tw

Valuation
- Inflation: 2.2%
- Source: 2008–2018
- Method: CPI 10-year average

New Taiwan dollar
- Traditional Chinese: 新臺幣
- Simplified Chinese: 新台币
Transcriptions
Standard Mandarin
- Hanyu Pinyin: Xīntáibì
- Wade–Giles: Hsin^{1}-t'ai^{2}-pi^{4}
Hakka
- Pha̍k-fa-sṳ: Sîn-thòi-pi
Yue: Cantonese
- Yale Romanization: Sāntòihbaih
- Jyutping: san^{1} toi^{4} bai^{6}
Southern Min
- Hokkien POJ: Sin-tâi-pè

Alternative Chinese name
- Chinese: 新臺票
Transcriptions
Hakka
- Pha̍k-fa-sṳ: Sîn-thòi-phêu
Yue: Cantonese
- Yale Romanization: Sāntòihpiu
Southern Min
- Hokkien POJ: Sin-tâi-phiò

The New Taiwan dollar (code: TWD; symbol: NT$ or $, also abbreviated as NT or NTD), or the Taiwan dollar, is the official currency of the Republic of China (Taiwan). Usually, the $ sign precedes the amount, but NT$ is used to distinguish from other currencies named dollar. The New Taiwan dollar has been the currency of the island of Taiwan since 1949, when it replaced the old Taiwan dollar, at a rate of 40,000 old dollars per one new dollar. The base unit of the New Taiwan dollar is called a yuan (圓), subdivided into ten jiao (角) or 100 fen (分), although in practice neither jiao nor fen are used.

There are a variety of alternative names for the units in Taiwan. The unit of the dollar is typically informally written with the simpler equivalent character as 元, except when writing it for legal transactions such as at the bank, when it has to be written as the homophonous 圓. Colloquially, the currency unit is called both 元 (yuán, literally "round") and 塊 (kuài, literally "piece") in Mandarin, 箍 (kho͘, literally "hoop") in Hokkien, and 銀 (ngiùn, literally "silver") in Hakka.

The Central Bank of the Republic of China (Taiwan) has issued the New Taiwan Dollar since 2000. Prior to 2000, the Bank of Taiwan issued banknotes as the de facto central bank between 1949 and 1961, and after 1961 continued to issue banknotes as a delegate of the central bank. The central bank began issuing New Taiwan dollar banknotes in July 2000, and the notes issued by the Bank of Taiwan were taken out of circulation.

== Terminology ==
		Mandarin	Taiwanese Hokkien	Hakka	English	Symbol
Currency name	Formal	新臺幣 (Xīntáibì)	新臺票 (Sin-tâi-phiò)	新臺幣 (Sîn-thòi-pi)	New Taiwan Dollar	NTD, TWD
Currency name	Other	臺幣 (Táibì)	臺票 (Tâi-phiò)	臺幣 (Thòi-pi)	New Taiwan Dollar	NTD, TWD
Unit name	Formal	圓 (yuán)	箍 (kho͘ )	銀 (ngiùn), 箍 (khiêu)	dollar	$
Unit name	Other	元 (yuán), 塊 (kuài)	箍 (kho͘ )	銀 (ngiùn), 箍 (khiêu)	dollar	$
1/10 Unit name	Formal	角 (jiǎo)	角 (kak)	角 (kok)	dime	角
1/10 Unit name	Other	毛 (máo)	角 (kak)	角 (kok)	dime	角
1/100 Unit name		分 (fēn)	仙 (sian)	仙 (siên)	cent	¢

The adjective "new" (新) is only added in formal contexts where it is necessary to avoid any ambiguity, even though ambiguity is virtually non-existent today. These contexts include banking, contracts, or foreign exchange. The currency unit name can be written as 圓 or 元, which are interchangeable. They are both pronounced yuán in Mandarin but have different pronunciations in Taiwanese Hokkien (îⁿ, goân) and Hakka (yèn, ngièn). The name 仙 in Taiwanese Hokkien and Hakka for cent is a loanword borrowed from English.

In English usage, the New Taiwan dollar is often abbreviated as NT, NT$, or NT dollar, while the abbreviation TWD is typically used in the context of foreign exchange rates. Subdivisions of a New Taiwan dollar are rarely used since practically all products on the consumer market are sold in whole dollars. Nevertheless, electronic transactions and bank statements can be expressed to 1 fen ($0.01).

== History ==
The various currencies called yuan or dollar issued in China, as well as the Japanese yen, were all derived from the Spanish American silver dollar, which China imported in large quantities from Spanish America through Spanish Philippines in the Manila–Acapulco Galleon Trade from the 16th to 20th centuries. After the use of the Spanish dollar and silver Chinese yuan in Taiwan, it issued the Taiwanese yen in 1895, followed by the Old Taiwan dollar in 1946.

The Bank of Taiwan first issued the New Taiwan dollar on 15 June 1949 to replace the Old Taiwan dollar at a ratio of 40,000 to one. The first goal of the New Taiwan dollar was to end the hyperinflation that had plagued Nationalist China due to the Chinese Civil War.

After the communists captured Beijing in January 1949, the Nationalists began to retreat to Taiwan. The government then declared in the Temporary Provisions Effective During the Period of Communist Rebellion that dollars issued by the Bank of Taiwan would become the new currency in circulation.

Even though the New Taiwan dollar was the de facto currency of Taiwan, statutes after 1949 still define the silver yuan or silver dollar as the legal currency, worth NT$3. Many older statutes have fines and fees given in silver yuan. Its value of NT$3 has not been updated despite decades of inflation, making the silver yuan a purely notional currency a long time ago, inconvertible to actual silver.

When the Temporary Provisions were made ineffective in 1991, the ROC lacked a legal national currency until the year 2000, when the Central Bank of China (CBC) replaced the Bank of Taiwan in issuing NT bills. In July 2000, the New Taiwan dollar became Taiwan's legal currency. It is no longer secondary to the silver yuan. At this time, the central bank began issuing New Taiwan dollar banknotes, and the notes issued earlier by the Bank of Taiwan were taken out of circulation.

The exchange rate compared to the United States dollar has varied from less than ten to one in the mid-1950s, more than forty to one in the 1960s, and about twenty–five to one in 1992. The exchange rate as of 10 September 2025 is NT$30.31 per US$.

== Coins ==
The denominations of the New Taiwan dollar in circulation are:

Currently Circulating Coins
Image	Value	Technical parameters			Description		Date of	
Image	Value	Diameter	Weight	Composition	Obverse	Reverse	first minting	issue
	NT$0.5	18 mm	3 g	97% copper 2.5% zinc 0.5% tin	Mei Blossom, "中華民國XX年"	Value	1981 (Minguo year 70)	1981-12-08
	NT$1	20 mm	3.8 g	92% copper 6% nickel 2% aluminium	Chiang Kai-shek, "中華民國XX年"	Value	1981 (Minguo year 70)	1981-12-08
	NT$5	22 mm	4.4 g	Cupronickel; 75% copper 25% nickel	Chiang Kai-shek, "中華民國XX年"	Value	1981 (Minguo year 70)	1981-12-08
	NT$10	26 mm	7.5 g	Cupronickel; 75% copper 25% nickel	Chiang Kai-shek, "中華民國XX年"	Value	1981 (Minguo year 70)	1981-12-08
	NT$10	26 mm	7.5 g	Cupronickel; 75% copper 25% nickel	Chiang Kai-shek, "中華民國XX年" (1981–2011); Sun Yat-sen, "中華民國XX年" (2012–present)	Value, continuous hidden words "國泰", "民安", continuous hidden Taiwan island and Mei Blossom in "0"	2011 (Minguo year 100)	2011-01-11
	NT$20	26.85 mm	8.5 g	Bi-metallic: Ring: Aluminium bronze (as $50); Centre: Cupronickel (as $10)	Mona Rudao, "莫那魯道", "中華民國XX年"	Traditional canoes used by the Tao people	2001 (Minguo year 90)	2001-07-09
	NT$50	28 mm	10 g	Aluminium bronze 92% copper 6% aluminium 2% nickel	Sun Yat-sen, "中華民國XX年"	Latent images of both Chinese and Arabic numerals for 50	2002 (Minguo year 91)	2002-04-26

== Banknotes ==
The current series of banknotes for the New Taiwan dollar began circulation in July 2000. This set was introduced when the New Taiwan dollar succeeded the silver yuan as the official currency within Taiwan.

The current set includes banknotes for NT$100, NT$200, NT$500, NT$1,000, and NT$2,000. Note that the NT$200 and NT$2,000 banknotes are not commonly used by consumers. This may be due to the tendency of consumers to simply use multiple NT$100 or NT$500 bills to cover the range of NT$200, as well as using multiple NT$1,000 bills or credit/debit cards instead of the NT$2,000 bill. Lack of government promotion may also be a contributing factor to the general lack of usage.

It is relatively easy for the government to disseminate these denominations through various government bodies that do official business with the citizens, such as the post office, the tax authority, or state–owned banks. There is also a conspiracy theory against the Democratic Progressive Party, the ruling party at the time the NT$200 and NT$2,000 denominations were issued. The conspiracy states that putting Chiang Kai-shek on a rarely used banknote would "practically" remove him from the currency while "nominally" including him on the currency would not upset supporters on the other side of the political spectrum that much (the Pan-Blue Coalition).

1999 Series
Image	Value	Dimensions	Main Color	Description			Date of			Remark
Image	Value	Dimensions	Main Color	Obverse	Reverse	Watermark	printing	issue	withdrawal	Remark
	NT$100	145 × 70 mm	Red	Sun Yat-sen, "The Chapter of Great Harmony" by Confucius	Chung-Shan Building	Mei flower and numeral 100	2000 (Minguo 89)	2001-07-02		
	NT$200	150 × 70 mm	Green	Chiang Kai-shek, theme of land reform and public education	Presidential Office Building	Orchid and numeral 200	2001 (Minguo year 90)	2002-01-02	Limited	
	NT$500	155 × 70 mm	Brown	Youth baseball	Formosan sika deer and Dabajian Mountain	Bamboo and numeral 500	2000 (Minguo year 89)	2000-12-15	2007-08-01	without holographic strip
	NT$500	155 × 70 mm	Brown	Youth baseball	Formosan sika deer and Dabajian Mountain	Bamboo and numeral 500	2004 (Minguo 93)	2005-07-20		with holographic strip
	NT$1,000	160 × 70 mm	Blue	Elementary Education (1999 errors)	Mikado pheasant and Yushan (Jade Mountain)	Chrysanthemum and numeral 1000	1999 (Minguo year 88)	2000-07-03	2007-08-01	without holographic strip
	NT$1,000	160 × 70 mm	Blue	Elementary Education (1999 errors)	Mikado pheasant and Yushan (Jade Mountain)	Chrysanthemum and numeral 1000	2004 (Minguo year 93)	2005-07-20		with holographic strip
	NT$2,000	165 × 70 mm	Purple	FORMOSAT-1, technology	Formosan landlocked salmon and Mount Nanhu	Pine and numeral 2000	2001 (Minguo year 90)	2002-07-01	Limited	with holographic strip

The year 2000 version $500 and 1999 version $1000 notes without holographic strip were officially taken out of circulation on 1 August 2007. They were redeemable at commercial banks until 30 September 2007. As of 1 October 2007, only Bank of Taiwan accepts such notes.

=== 100–dollar commemorative note ===
On 6 January 2011, the Central Bank of the Republic of China issued a new 100–dollar legal tender circulating commemorative in celebration of the 100th anniversary of the founding of the Republic of China. The red paper note measures 145 × 70 mm and features a portrait of Dr. Sun Yat-sen on the front and the Chung-Shan Building on the back. The design is no different from the ordinary NT$100 note, except for the Chinese wording on the reverse of the note, which reads "Celebrating 100 years since the founding of the Republic of China (慶祝中華民國建國一百年)".

== Exchange rates ==
Current TWD exchange rates
From Google Finance:	AUD CAD CHF CNY EUR GBP HKD JPY USD KRW SGD
From Yahoo! Finance:	AUD CAD CHF CNY EUR GBP HKD JPY USD KRW SGD
From XE.com:	AUD CAD CHF CNY EUR GBP HKD JPY USD KRW SGD
From OANDA:	AUD CAD CHF CNY EUR GBP HKD JPY USD KRW SGD

Most traded currencies by value Currency distribution of global foreign exchange market turnover
Currency	ISO 4217 code	Proportion of daily volume		Change (2022–2025)
Currency	ISO 4217 code	April 2022	April 2025	Change (2022–2025)
U.S. dollar	USD	88.4%	89.2%	▲0.8pp
Euro	EUR	30.6%	28.9%	▼1.7pp
Japanese yen	JPY	16.7%	16.8%	▲0.1pp
Pound sterling	GBP	12.9%	10.2%	▼2.7pp
Renminbi	CNY	7.0%	8.5%	▲1.5pp
Swiss franc	CHF	5.2%	6.4%	▲1.2pp
Australian dollar	AUD	6.4%	6.1%	▼0.3pp
Canadian dollar	CAD	6.2%	5.8%	▼0.4pp
Hong Kong dollar	HKD	2.6%	3.8%	▲1.2pp
Singapore dollar	SGD	2.4%	2.4%	Steady
Indian rupee	INR	1.6%	1.9%	▲0.3pp
South Korean won	KRW	1.8%	1.8%	Steady
Swedish krona	SEK	2.2%	1.6%	▼0.6pp
Mexican peso	MXN	1.5%	1.6%	▲0.1pp
New Zealand dollar	NZD	1.7%	1.5%	▼0.2pp
Norwegian krone	NOK	1.7%	1.3%	▼0.4pp
New Taiwan dollar	TWD	1.1%	1.2%	▲0.1pp
Brazilian real	BRL	0.9%	0.9%	Steady
South African rand	ZAR	1.0%	0.8%	▼0.2pp
Polish złoty	PLN	0.7%	0.8%	▲0.1pp
Danish krone	DKK	0.7%	0.7%	Steady
Indonesian rupiah	IDR	0.4%	0.7%	▲0.3pp
Turkish lira	TRY	0.4%	0.5%	▲0.1pp
Thai baht	THB	0.4%	0.5%	▲0.1pp
Israeli new shekel	ILS	0.4%	0.4%	Steady
Hungarian forint	HUF	0.3%	0.4%	▲0.1pp
Czech koruna	CZK	0.4%	0.4%	Steady
Chilean peso	CLP	0.3%	0.3%	Steady
Philippine peso	PHP	0.2%	0.2%	Steady
Colombian peso	COP	0.2%	0.2%	Steady
Malaysian ringgit	MYR	0.2%	0.2%	Steady
UAE dirham	AED	0.4%	0.1%	▼0.3pp
Saudi riyal	SAR	0.2%	0.1%	▼0.1pp
Romanian leu	RON	0.1%	0.1%	Steady
Peruvian sol	PEN	0.1%	0.1%	Steady
Other currencies		2.6%	3.4%	▲0.8pp
Total (Note: The total sum is 200% because each currency trade is counted twice: once for the currency being bought and once for the currency being sold. The percentages above represent the proportion of all trades involving a given currency, regardless of which side of the transaction it is on.)		200.0%	200.0%	

== See also ==
- Old Taiwan dollar
- Economy of Taiwan
- Taxation in Taiwan
- History of the Republic of China
- ROC consumer voucher

== Notes ==
=== Words in different languages ===
Preceded by: Old Taiwan dollar Reason: inflation Ratio: 1 new dollar = 40,000 old dollars	Currency of Taiwan; 1949 – Note: After the communists took over most of Mainland China, the government of the Republic of China controlled only Taiwan and some offshore islands.	Succeeded by: Current
