= Central Mint =

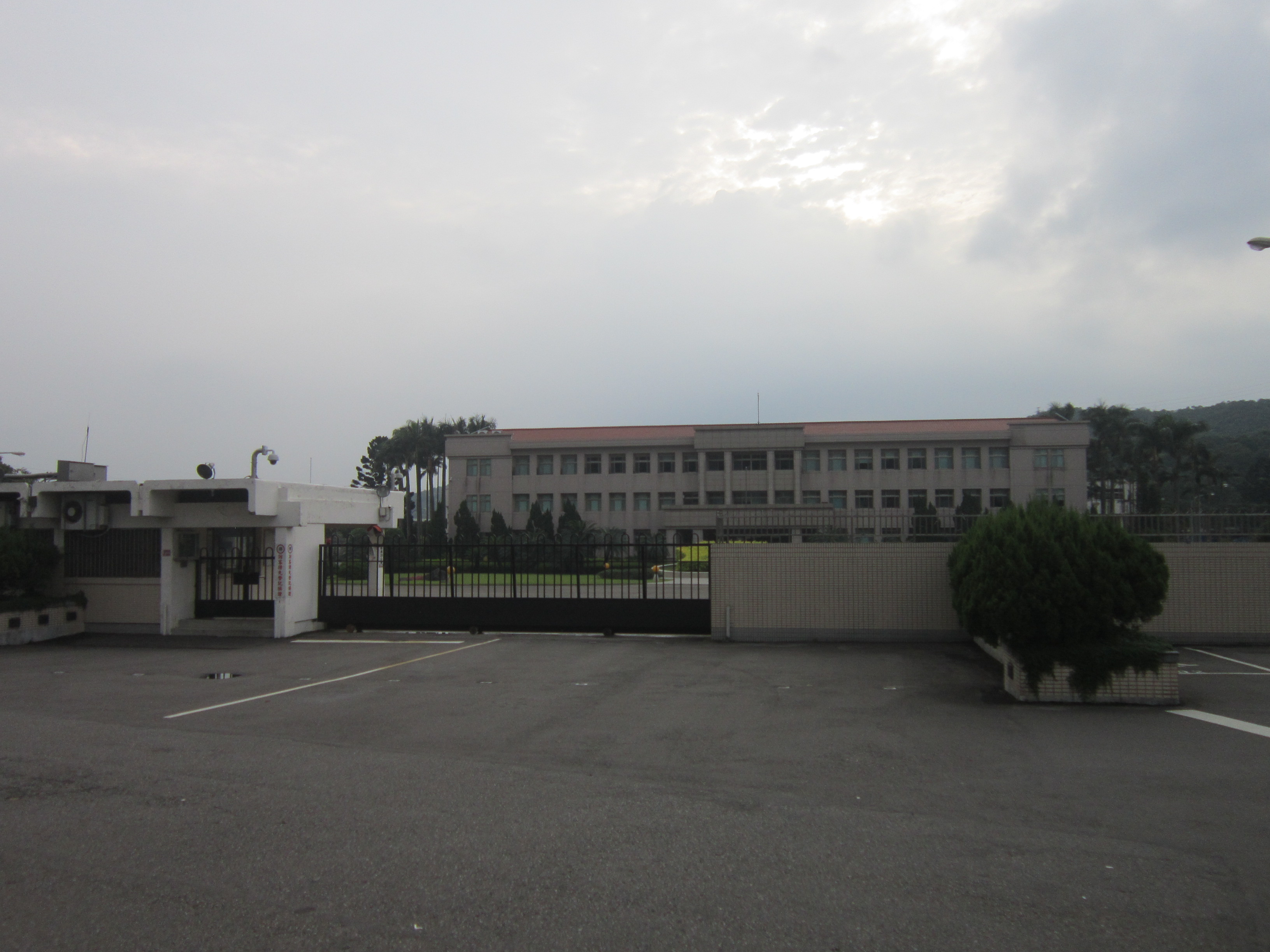
- Native name: 中央造幣廠
- Romanized name: Zhōngyāng Zàobìchǎng (Mandarin); Tiong-iong Chō-pè-chhiúⁿ (Taiwanese); Tûng-ông Chho-pi-chhóng (Hakka)
- Formerly: Central Mint of China; Shanghai Mint
- Type: State-owned
- Founded: 1920 (in Shanghai); 1949 (in Taipei)
- Headquarters: Guishan, Taoyuan, Taiwan
- Parent: Central Bank of the Republic of China (Taiwan)
- Website: www.cmc.gov.tw

Central Mint
- Traditional Chinese: 中央造幣廠
- Simplified Chinese: 中央造币厂
Transcriptions
Standard Mandarin
- Hanyu Pinyin: Zhōngyāng Zàobìchǎng
- Bopomofo: ㄓㄨㄥ ㄧㄤ ㄗㄠˋ ㄅㄧˋ ㄔㄤˇ
- Gwoyeu Romatzyh: Jong'iang Tzawbihchaang
- Wade–Giles: Chung¹-yang¹ Tsao⁴-pi⁴-chang³
- Tongyong Pinyin: Jhongyang Zàobìchǎng
- MPS2: Jōngyāng Tzàobìchǎng
Hakka
- Pha̍k-fa-sṳ: Tûng-ông Chho-pi-chhóng
Southern Min
- Hokkien POJ: Tiong-iong Chō-pè-chhiúⁿ
- Tâi-lô: Tiong-iong Tsō-pè-tshiúnn

The Central Mint, known in English before 2004 as the Central Mint of China (CMC), is a subsidiary company of the Central Bank of the Republic of China (Taiwan). The major activities of the mint are minting and melting circulation and commemorative coins, and producing commemorative medals and other kind of casting products for government institutions and businesses in Taiwan.

== History ==
The mint was originally established as Shanghai Mint in Shanghai in 1920.

In 1928, Northern Expedition forces led by the Kuomintang took over Shanghai, and the Shanghai Mint was renamed Central Mint of China and became the subordinate of Ministry of Finance. Australian-Chinese merchant George Kwok Bew was appointed head of the CMC. Kwok was an associate of Sun Yat-sen and also managing director of Wing On. Five years later in 1933, the company started its operation in minting. During the Second Sino-Japanese War, the company had to be relocated inland of mainland China in which facilities were set up in Chengdu, Guilin, Kunming, Lanzhou and Wuchang. In 1946 after the National Revolutionary Army won the war against the Japanese, the company relocated back to Shanghai.

In 1949, in the later stages of the Chinese Civil War, Shanghai was taken over by Communist forces. Part of the CMC was evacuated to Taiwan, while the remaining equipment and personnel were received by the Communist military administration in May 1949 and reorganised as "the People's Mint", now the Shanghai Mint, a subsidiary of China Banknote Printing and Minting.

The CMC officially relocated to Taiwan in May 1949 and facilities were set up in Taipei. It then became the subordinate of the Central Bank of the Republic of China (Taiwan). In 1976, the facility was relocated to Guishan Township in Taoyuan County until today.

== Organizational structures ==
- Planning Division
- Procurement and Supply Division
- Quality Control Division
- Secretariat
- Accounting Office
- Personnel Office
- Labor Safety and Health Office
- Ethics Office
- Information Management Office
- Melting and Rolling Office
- Coining and Packing Works
- Fine Casting Works
- Maintenance Works

== See also ==
- Central Bank of the Republic of China (Taiwan)
- Central Engraving and Printing Plant
- List of mints
