= Rail transport in Taiwan =

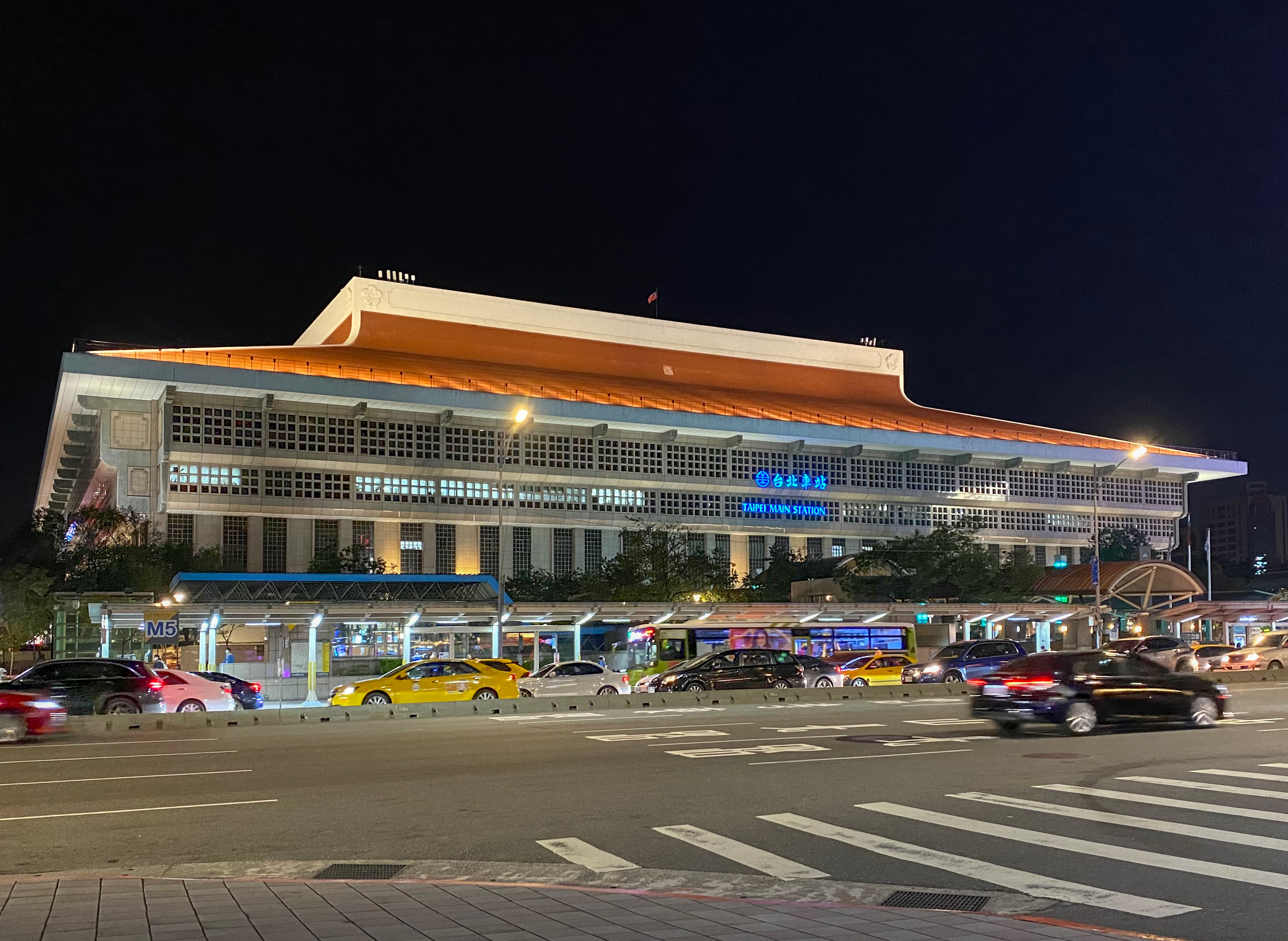
- Taipei Main Station in 2021, it's the busiest railway station in Taiwan

Operation
- National railway: Taiwan Railway
- Major operators: Taiwan High Speed Rail

Statistics
- Ridership: 287 million (2016)
- Passenger-distance: 21.5 billion (2016)

System length
- Total: 2,033 kilometres (1,263 mi)
- Double track: 1,075 km (668 mi)
- Electrified: 1,233 km (766 mi)
- High-speed: 352 km (219 mi)

Track gauge
- Main: 1,067 mm (3 ft 6 in)
- High-speed: 1,435 mm (4 ft 8 1/2 in)
- 1,067 mm (3 ft 6 in): 1,065 kilometres (662 mi)
- 1,435 mm (4 ft 8 1/2 in): 513 kilometres (319 mi)

Features
- Longest tunnel: Xinguanyin Tunnel; 10.3071 kilometres (6.4045 mi)
- Longest bridge: THSR Changhua-Kaohsiung Viaduct; 157.317 kilometres (97.752 mi)
Map

Rail transport in Taiwan consists of 2,025 kilometres (1,258 mi) (as of 2015) of railway networks. Though no longer as dominant as it once was, rail transport is an extremely important form of transportation in Taiwan due to high population density, especially along the densely populated western corridor. In 2016, over 1.09 billion passengers traveled by rail in Taiwan, averaging 2.99 million passengers per day.

The railways of Taiwan include conventional rail, rapid transit systems, and high-speed rail, as well as specialized railways for tourists and industry. Taiwan Railways Administration is an associate member and Taiwan High Speed Rail is an active member of the International Union of Railways (UIC), even though Taiwan does not have state membership.

Rail transport was introduced to Taiwan in 1891 during its late Qing era. Push car railways were brought to Taiwan during Japanese rule and were in general service from 1895 to the late 1940s.

All railway services are located in the main island of Taiwan. Outer islands including Penghu, Kinmen, and Matsu Islands do not have railways.

== Intercity railways ==
There are two railway systems that provide intercity transportation service in Taiwan:

Name	Taiwan Railway	Taiwan High Speed Rail
Logo		
Chinese	臺灣鐵路	台灣高速鐵路
Service type	Conventional railway	High-speed railway
Open date	1891-10-20	2007-01-05
Gauge	1,067 mm (3 ft 6 in)	1,435 mm (4 ft 8 1/2 in)
Lines	13	1
Stations	228	12
System length	1,065 km (662 mi)	349.5 km (217 mi)

The Taiwan Railways, formerly administered by the governmental agency Taiwan Railways Administration (TRA), has been operated by Taiwan Railway since 1 January 2024. TR operates both passenger service and the only freight service in the country. The main lines form a loop around the island that connects most of the country's major cities, with small branch lines at various points to the interior. TR operates both intercity trains throughout Taiwan, and commuter services into the major cities. The Taiwan High Speed Rail is operated by a franchised private company called Taiwan High Speed Rail Corporation, it contains passenger services between Nangang, Taipei and Zuoying, Kaohsiung with a route that runs through Western Taiwan.

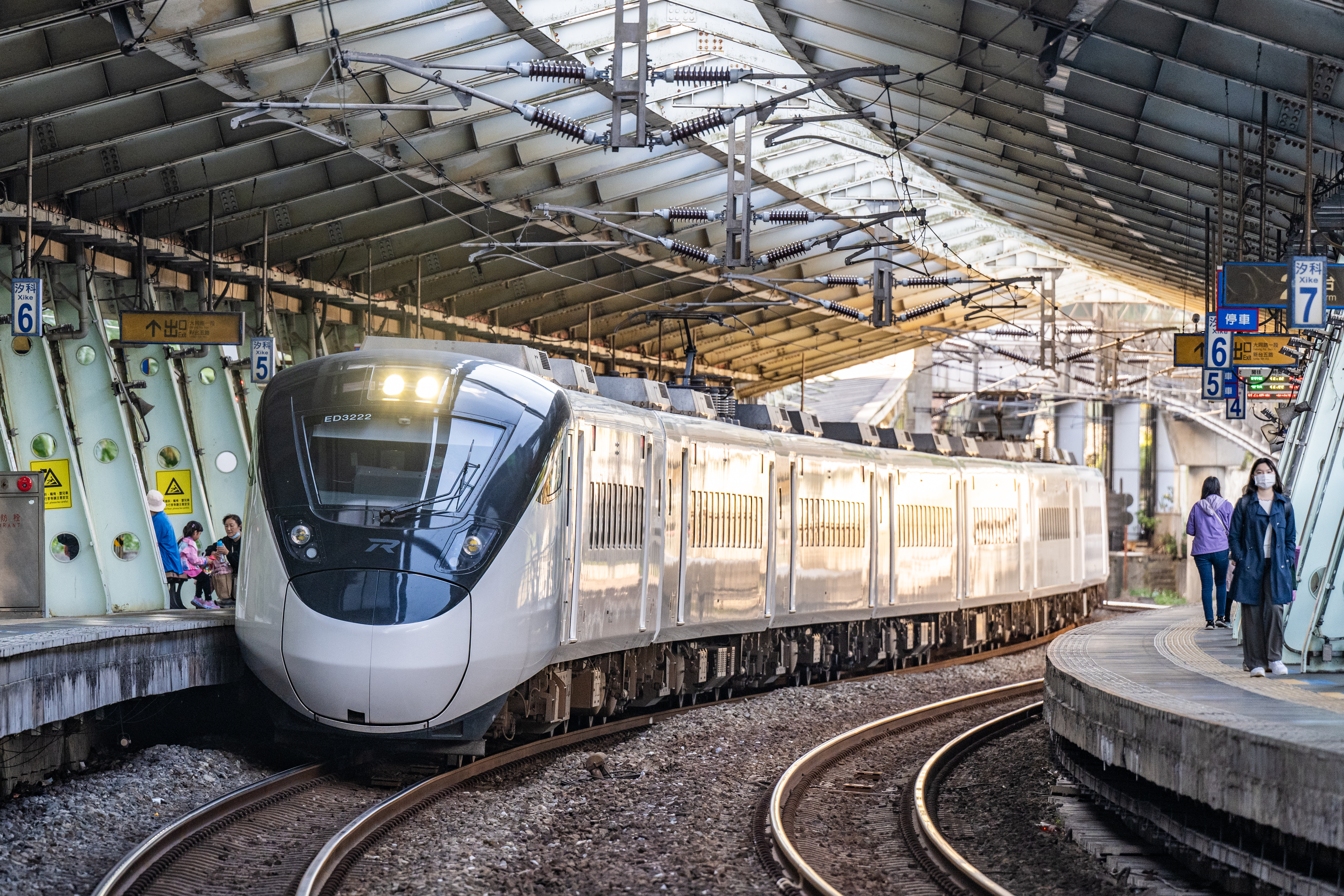
TRA train passing over Xike Station.

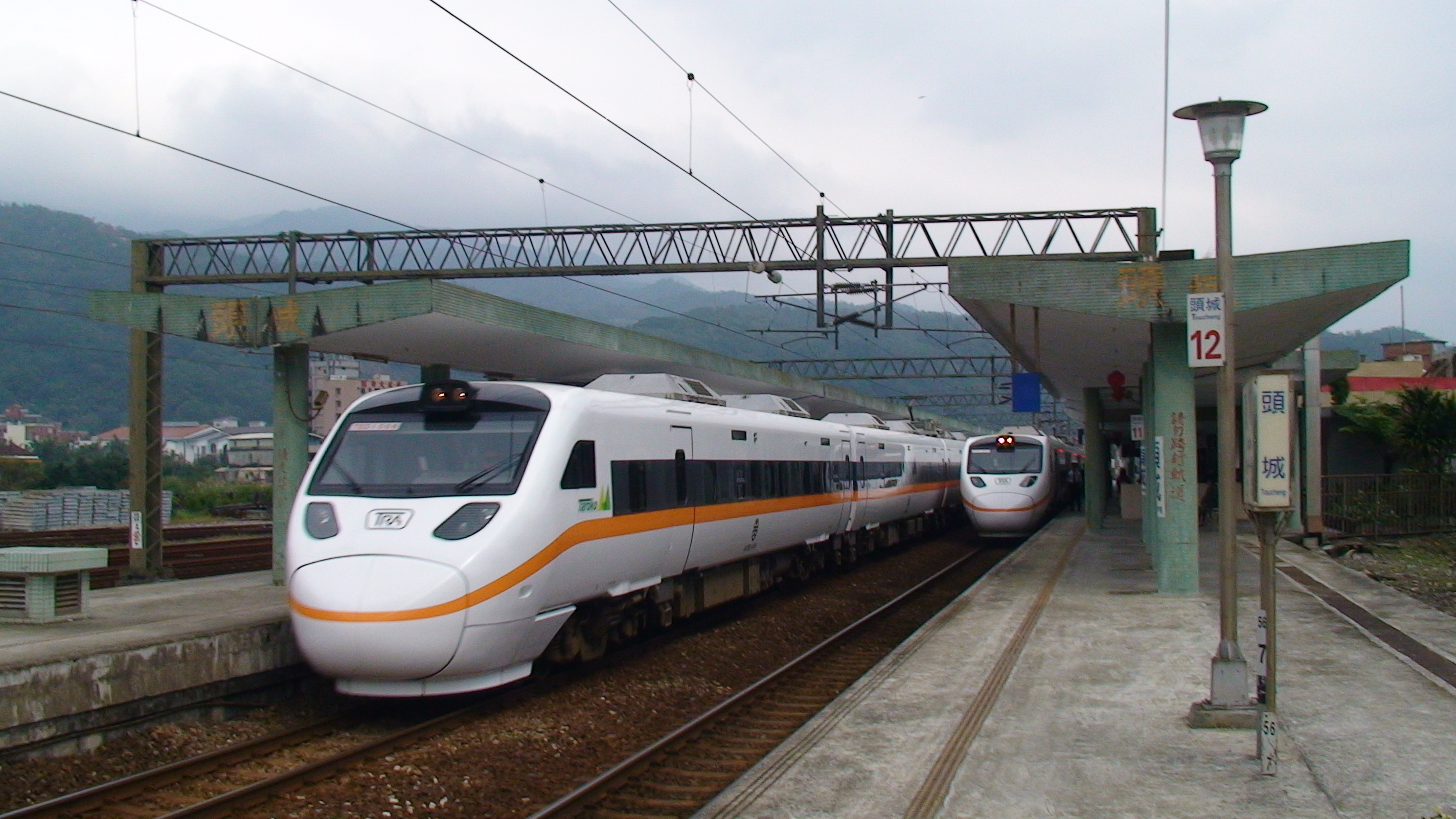
A TRA Taroko Express train stands at Toucheng Station as another pulls alongside

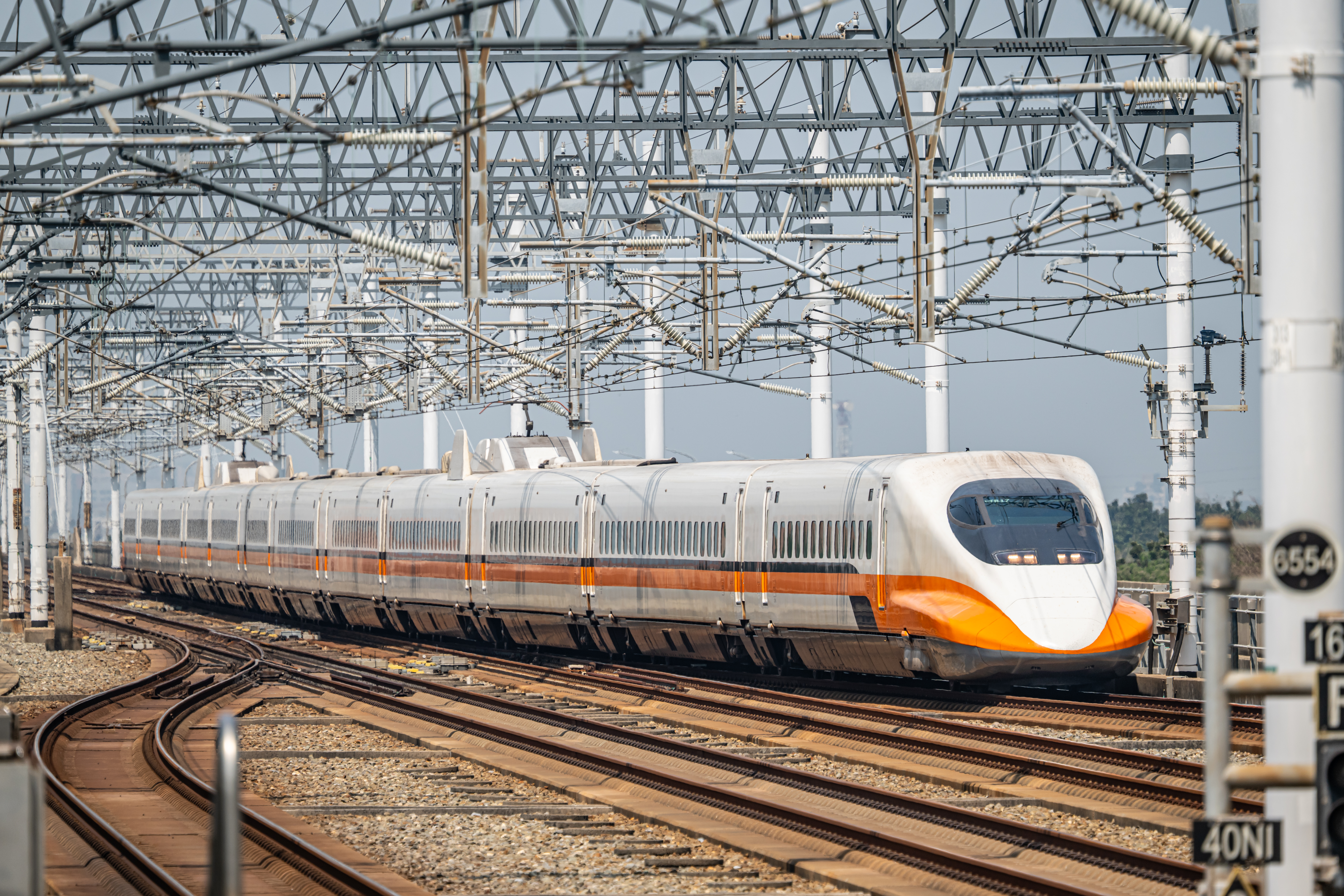
THSR 700T arriving Tainan HSR station.

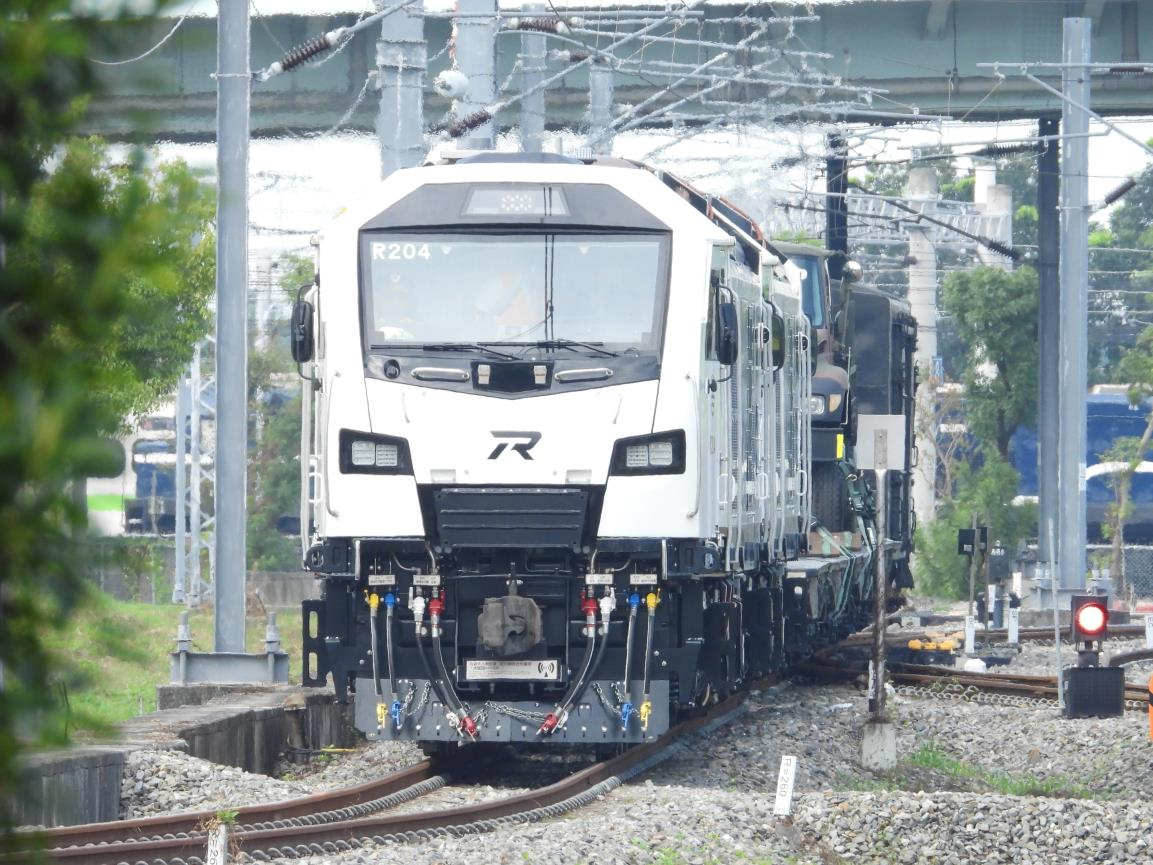
A Stadler made R200 locomotive at Hualien Station

== Urban transit ==
Cities of Taiwan with rapid transit systems.

Urban rail transit systems are managed by local governments. There are currently five operators in Taiwan's major urban centers.

Transit systems in Taiwan
Name	Area	Annual traffic	Metro lines	Metro stations	Metro length	Light rail lines	Light rail stations	Light rail length
Taipei Metro	Taipei, New Taipei	789.599 million (2019)	5	117 (Note: Nine transfer stations doubly counted)	131.1 km (81 mi)	—N/a	—N/a	—N/a
Kaohsiung Metro	Kaohsiung	127.855 million (2018)	2	37	53.3 km (33 mi)	1	38	22.1 km (14 mi)
Taoyuan Metro	Taoyuan, Taipei, New Taipei	27.962 million (2019)	1	21	51.03 km (32 mi)	—N/a	—N/a	—N/a
New Taipei Metro	New Taipei, Taipei	7.558 million (2023)	1	14	15.4 km (10 mi)	2	23	17.22 km (11 mi)
Taichung MRT	Taichung	n/a	1	18	16.71 km (10 mi)	—N/a	—N/a	—N/a

Most of the urban rail transit systems use standard gauge 1,435 mm (4 ft 8 1/2 in), except Taipei Metro Wenhu line, which uses VAL system with 1,880 mm (6 ft 2 in) track gauge. The main line of Taoyuan Metro is called the Taoyuan Airport MRT, which connects Taoyuan International Airport, Taiwan's largest airport, with Taipei and Zhongli, Taoyuan. In addition to the five systems above, there were also plans to build rapid transit systems in municipalities of Tainan and Hsinchu. However, the Ministry of Transportation and Communications declined the proposals in January 2010 for budget issues and deeming it premature. Recently, most plans of new urban rail transit system plans have adopted light rail for budget efficiency.

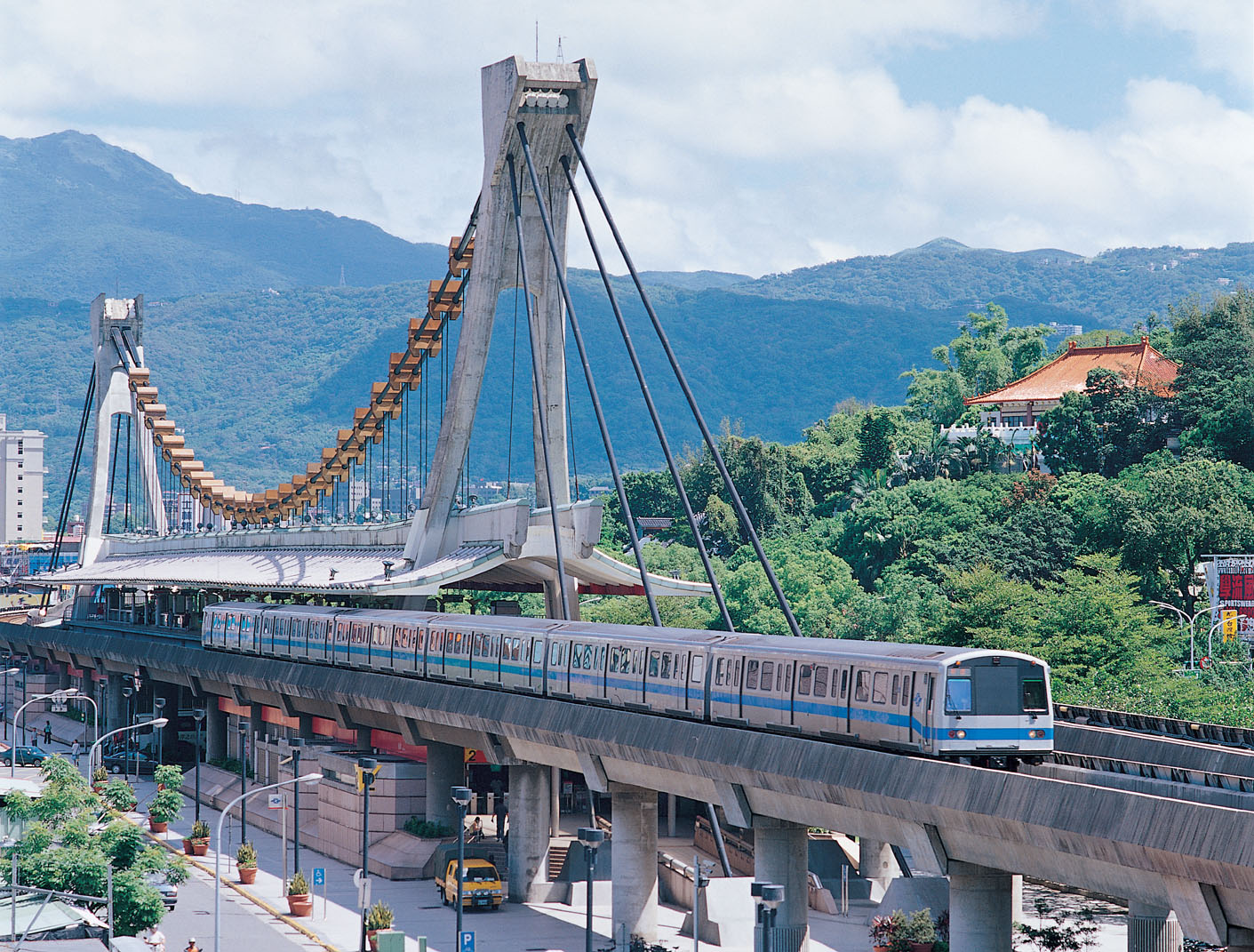
Unique dragon boat architecture of Jiantan on Tamsui–Xinyi Line of Taipei Metro

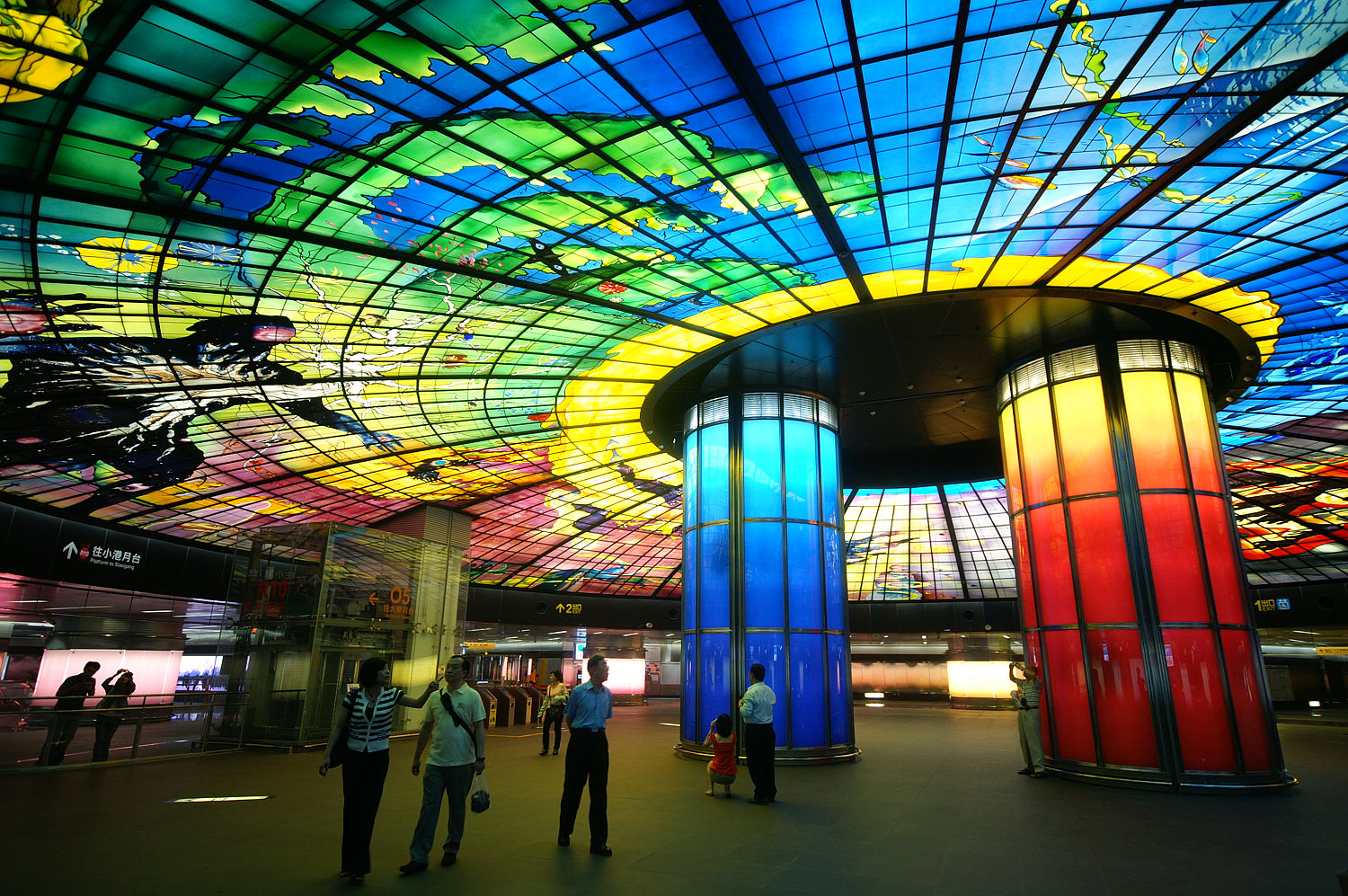
Formosa Boulevard Station's "Dome of Light" on the Kaohsiung MRT

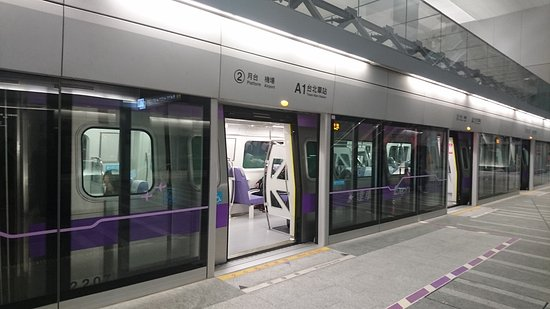
Taipei Main Station of Taoyuan Metro

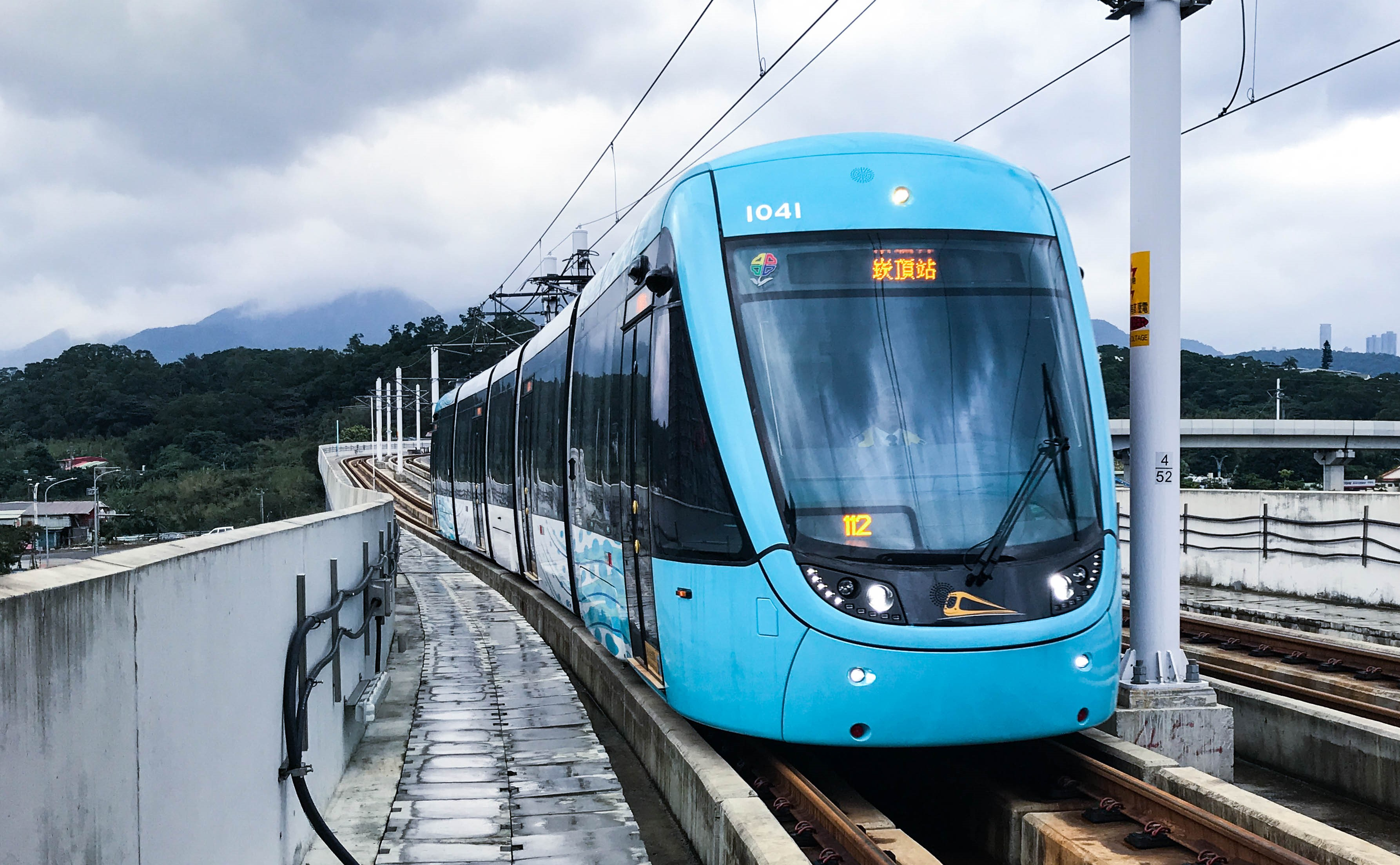
Train on the Danhai light rail of New Taipei Metro

== Industrial and tourist railways ==
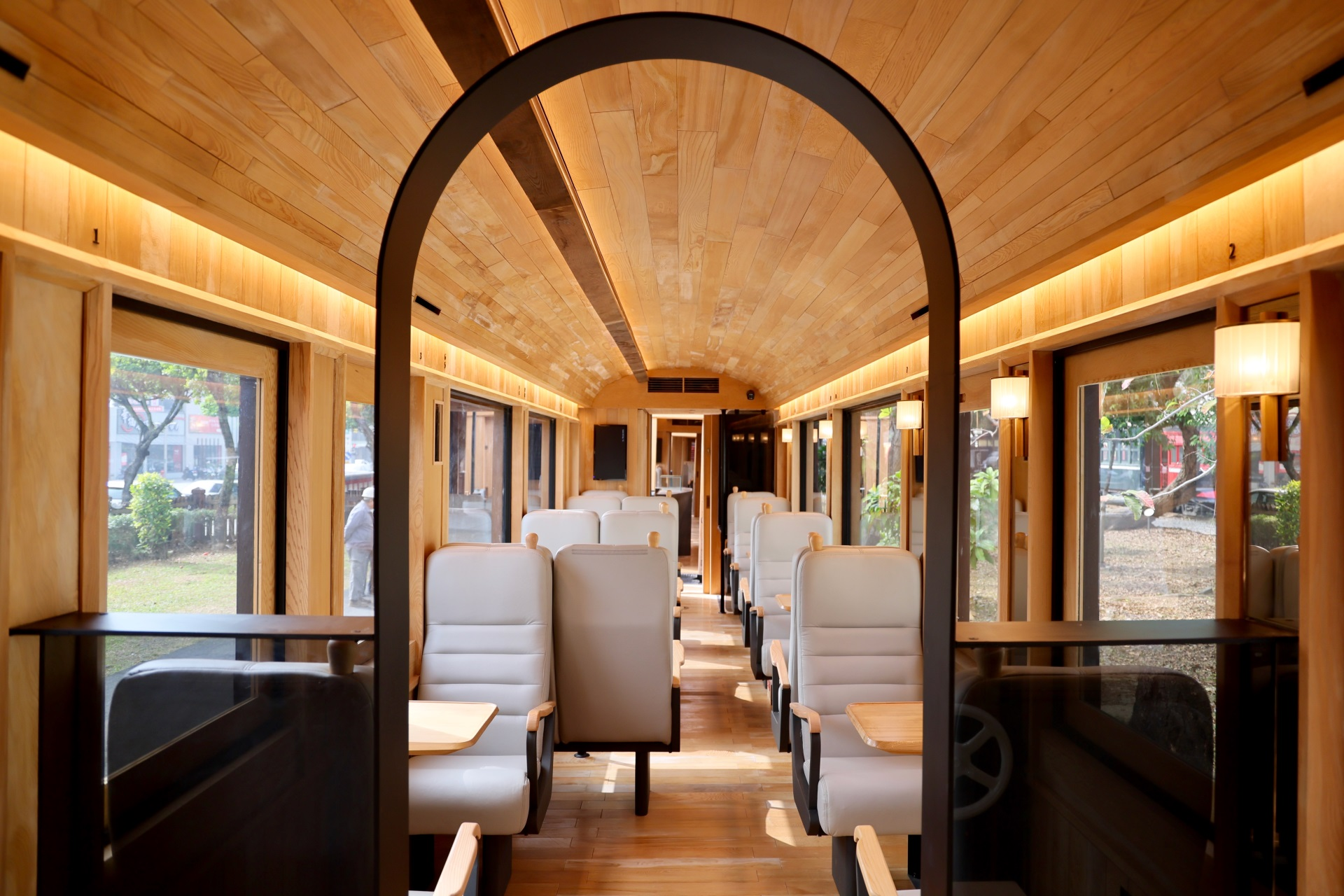
Interior of the Alishan Forest Railway Formosensis Train.

Industrial railways were built mainly in the Japanese era for transporting industrial raw materials and products, especially sugarcanes for sugar industry, and lumber for wood industry in Taiwan. After World War II, these industries declined significantly and these railroads were remodeled as tourist attractions in the beginning of 21st century.

Name	Taiwan Sugar Railways	Taiwan Forest Railways
Chinese	臺灣糖業鐵路	臺灣森林鐵路
Owner	Taiwan Sugar Corporation	Forestry and Nature Conservation Agency
Logo		
Date opening	1906	1912
Gauge	762 mm (2 ft 6 in)	762 mm (2 ft 6 in)
No. of Lines	1 industrial line, 5 tourist lines	4 tourist lines

The Taiwan Sugar Railways is an extensive series of narrow gauge lines mostly in central and southern Taiwan, originally built to haul sugarcane by the sugar companies in Japanese era, but also capable of providing limited passenger service. Regular passenger services discontinued in 1982. In 2003, some short-distance train services resumed. Currently there are six lines in operation.

Name	Chinese	Length	Location
Magongcuo line	馬公厝線	16.1 km (10.0 mi)	Huwei, Yunlin
Xihu line	溪湖線	3.6 km (2.2 mi)	Xihu, Changhua
Zhecheng line	蔗埕線	2.56 km (1.59 mi)	Lioujiao, Chiayi
Baweng line	八翁線	5.6 km (3.5 mi)	Xinying and Liouying, Tainan
Xingang East line	新港東線	2.7 km (1.7 mi)	Houbi, Tainan
Qiaotou line	橋頭線	1.5 km (0.93 mi)	Ciaotou, Kaohsiung

Only Magongcuo line in Huwei Sugar Refinery is still in industrial use, the other five lines have been transformed to heritage railways.

The Forest Railways were built for logging and timber industry, now recommissioned as tourist railway services in high mountains.

Name	Chinese	Length	Location
Alishan Forest Railway	阿里山森林鐵路	86 km (53 mi)	Chiayi City and Chiayi County
Taiping Mountain Forest Railway	太平山森林鐵路	36.4 km (22.6 mi)	Yilan County
Luodong Forest Railway	羅東森林鐵路	3.9 km (2.4 mi)	Yilan County
Wulai Scenic Train	烏來台車	1.5 km (0.93 mi)	Wulai, New Taipei

The Alishan Forest Railway is currently the largest tourist railway network in Taiwan, operated by the Forestry and Nature Conservation Agency. The Luodong Forest Railway and Taiping Mountain Forest Railway were interconnected to transport the harvested lumber from Taiping Mountain to Luodong, Yilan and transferred to major railway system of Taiwan. Now only a short 3.9 km (2.4 mi) section near Tiansongpi Station is operating. Wulai Scenic Train was originally tracks for rail push trolleys, now runs a light automotive for tourists.

== Track gauge ==
The earliest railway in Taiwan was completed in 1893 under the auspices of Governor Liu Mingchuan during the Qing Era and rebuilt by the Governors-General during the Japanese Era (see Taiwan Railway#History). Since then, major railways in Taiwan have followed the 3 ft 6 in (1,067 mm) gauge standard. The Taitung Line was built during the Japanese Era with 2 ft 6 in (762 mm) gauge, but since 1982 it has been converted to 3 ft 6 in (1,067 mm), while the Alishan Forest Railway and the majority of Taiwan Sugar Railways are still 2 ft 6 in (762 mm) railways. The Taiwan High Speed Rail and all rapid transit systems use standard gauge track.

== Cultural ==
Because of Taiwan's extensive rail network (including many now defunct industrial narrow gauge lines which provided passenger service to rural areas), railways in Taiwan often have a romantic connotation, especially amongst the older generation who remember growing up when rail travel was the primary means of transportation between cities in simpler (and less prosperous) times. Many remember leaving their hometowns to attend school in far away cities by train or leaving via train to perform their compulsory military service. This nostalgia has been capitalized upon in recent years through the introduction of various items such as “old-fashioned railway bento” (Chinese: 懷舊鐵路便當), claimed to be authentic copies of the box lunches that were once served aboard trains. The most famous version of railway bentos is the classic porkchop bento by Taiwan Railway Bento.

=== Railfan culture ===
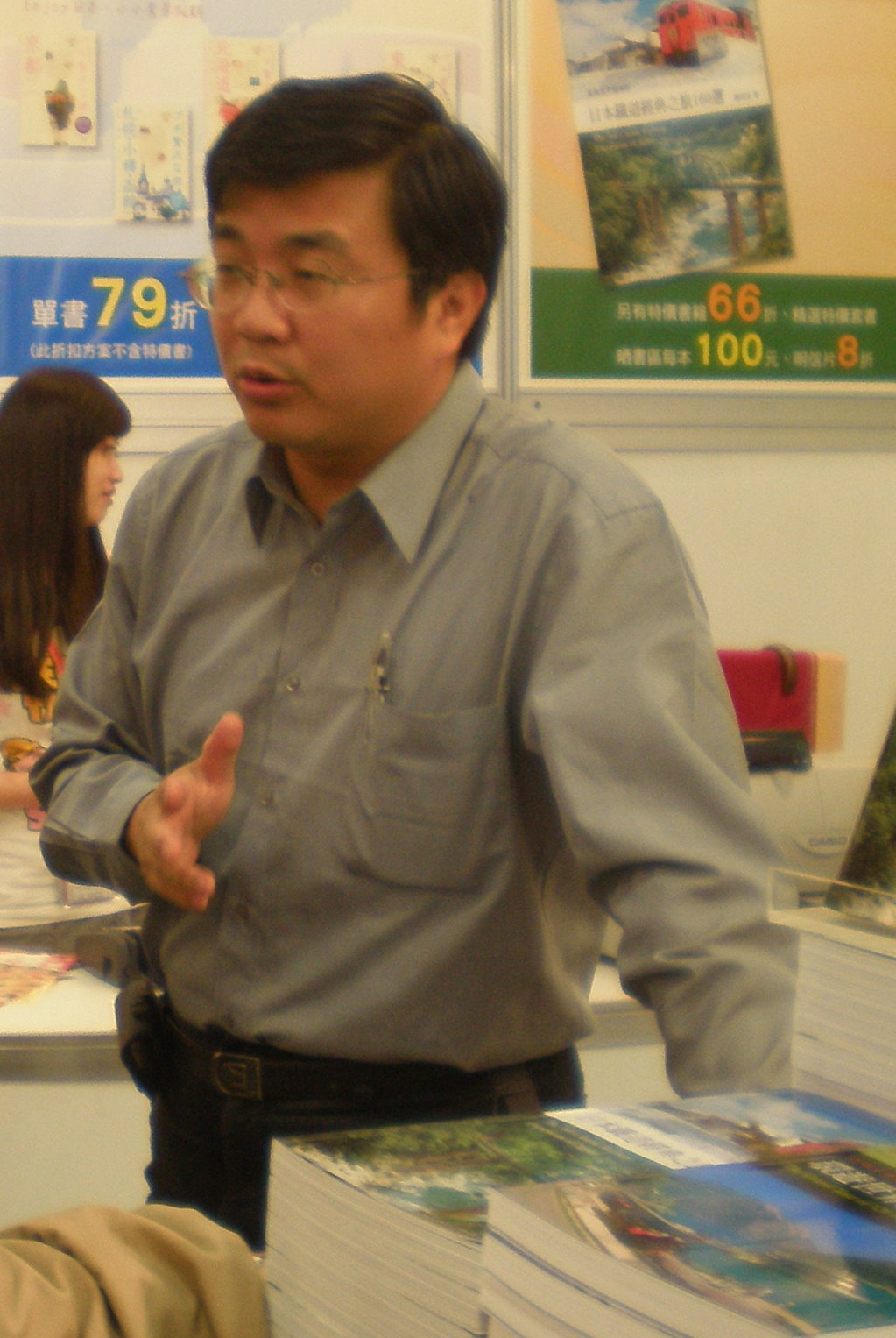
Su Chao-Hsu (1967–), a prominent railway enthusiast and transport professor

Taiwan also has a rail enthusiast culture that dates back to 9 June 1988, when the National Chiao Tung University's Rail Institute, the first college student club in Taiwan, was established, with its first leader being Jen Heng-yi. Jen and his fellow club members would work to publish what became the first issue of the popular long-running railfan publication Rail News in 1989. The success the club had with other local railfans was followed by the establishment of similar clubs in other Taiwanese universities such as in the National Taiwan University and Tamkang University in Taipei, as well as one at National Cheng Kung University in Tainan. The first private rail association, Railway Culture Society was subsequently established in 1995 after Jen and other founders of the Rail Institute transitioned away from student life.

Some prominent railway enthusiasts in Taiwan include assistant professor Dr. Hung Chih-Wen of the National Taiwan Normal University and technical assistant professor Su Chao-Hsu of the National Kaohsiung University of Hospitality and Tourism.

== See also ==
- List of railway stations in Taiwan
- Taiwan Railways Administration
- Transportation in Taiwan
