= Wulai Forestry Life Museum =

Museum in Wulai, New Taipei, Taiwan

- 烏來林業生活館
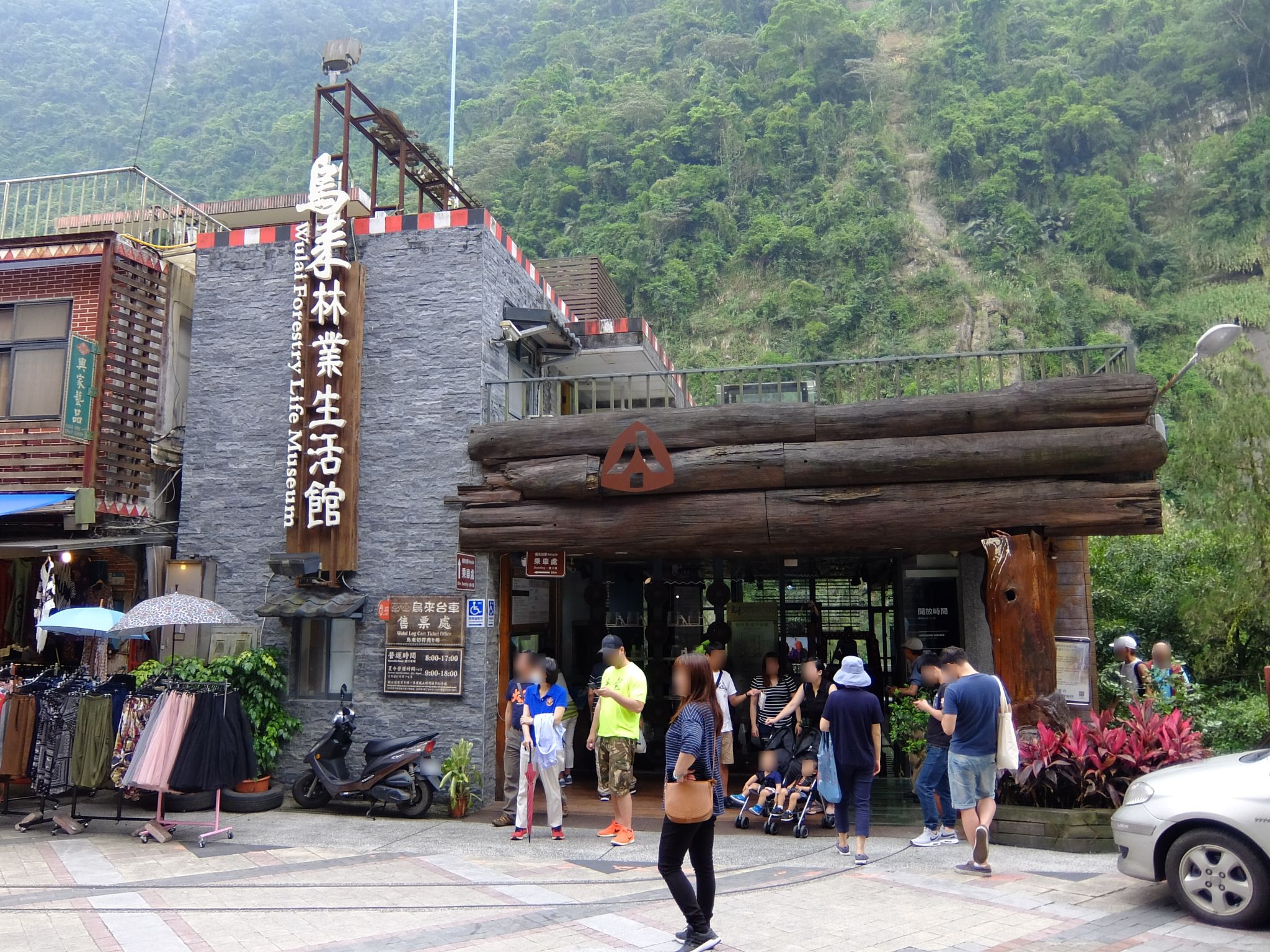
- Established: 2010
- Location: Wulai, New Taipei, Taiwan
- Coordinates: 24°50′54.7″N 121°33′06.4″E
- Type: museum

The Wulai Forestry Life Museum (traditional Chinese: 烏來林業生活館; simplified Chinese: 乌来林业生活馆; pinyin: Wūlái Línyè Shēnghuó Guǎn) is a museum about forest in Wulai District, New Taipei, Taiwan.

== History ==
The museum was originally opened in 2010 as the Wulai Tram Museum or Wulai Log Cart Museum (Chinese: 烏來台車博物館; pinyin: Wūlái Táichē Bówùguǎn).

== Exhibitions ==
The museum exhibits the history of logging in Wulai area and also its log cart trains for logging transportation.

== See also ==
- List of museums in Taiwan
- Wulai Scenic Train
