= Wulai Waterfall =

Waterfall in Wuai, New Taipei, Taiwan

Wulai Waterfall 烏來瀑布 Kuân-tsuí
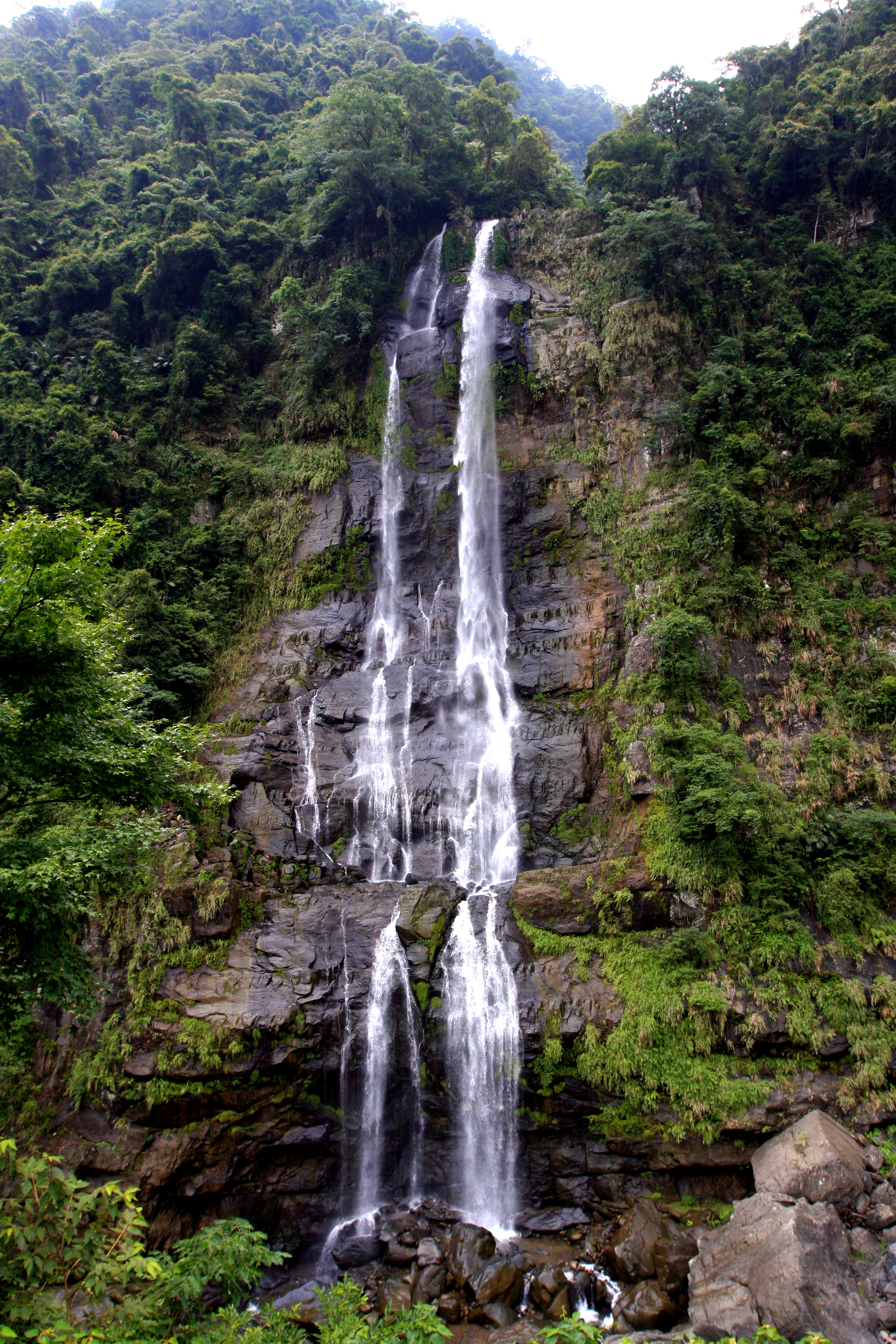
- Interactive map of Wulai Waterfall 烏來瀑布; Kuân-tsuí
- Location: Wulai, New Taipei, Taiwan
- Coordinates: 24°50′51″N 121°33′8.35″E
- Type: waterfall
- Total height: 80 m (260 ft)

The Wulai Waterfall (traditional Chinese: 烏來瀑布; simplified Chinese: 乌来瀑布; pinyin: Wūlái Pùbù) or Kuân-tsuí (lit. high water) in Taiwanese Hokkien, is a waterfall in Wulai District, New Taipei, Taiwan.

== Geology ==
The height of the waterfall is around 80 meters. It has a width of around 10 meters.

== Transportation ==
The base of the waterfall is accessible by Wulai Scenic Train at Waterfall Stop.

== See also ==
- List of waterfalls
