= Yun Hsien Resort =

Resort in Wulai, New Taipei, Taiwan

- 雲仙樂園
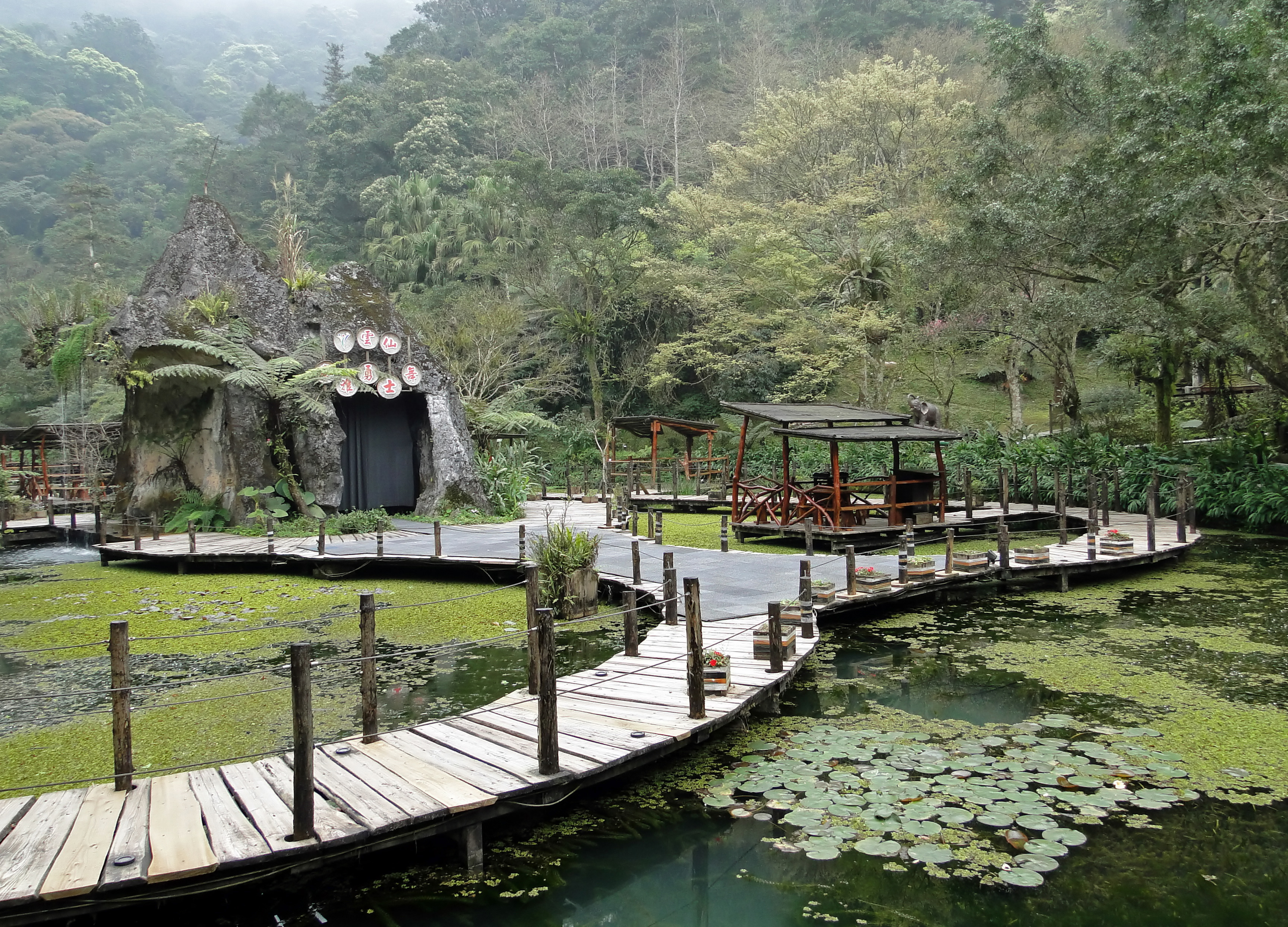
- Interactive map of the Yun Hsien Resort area

General information
- Location: Wulai, New Taipei, Taiwan
- Coordinates: 24°50′40.9″N 121°33′21.2″E
- Opened: 6 August 1967

Website
- Official website

The Yun Hsien Resort (traditional Chinese: 雲仙樂園; simplified Chinese: 云仙乐园; pinyin: Yúnxiān Yuèyuán) is a resort in Wulai District, New Taipei, Taiwan.

== History ==
The resort was originally opened on 6 August 1967 and constructed as the first theme park in Taiwan.

== Architecture ==
The resort features a zoo and theme park.

== Transportation ==
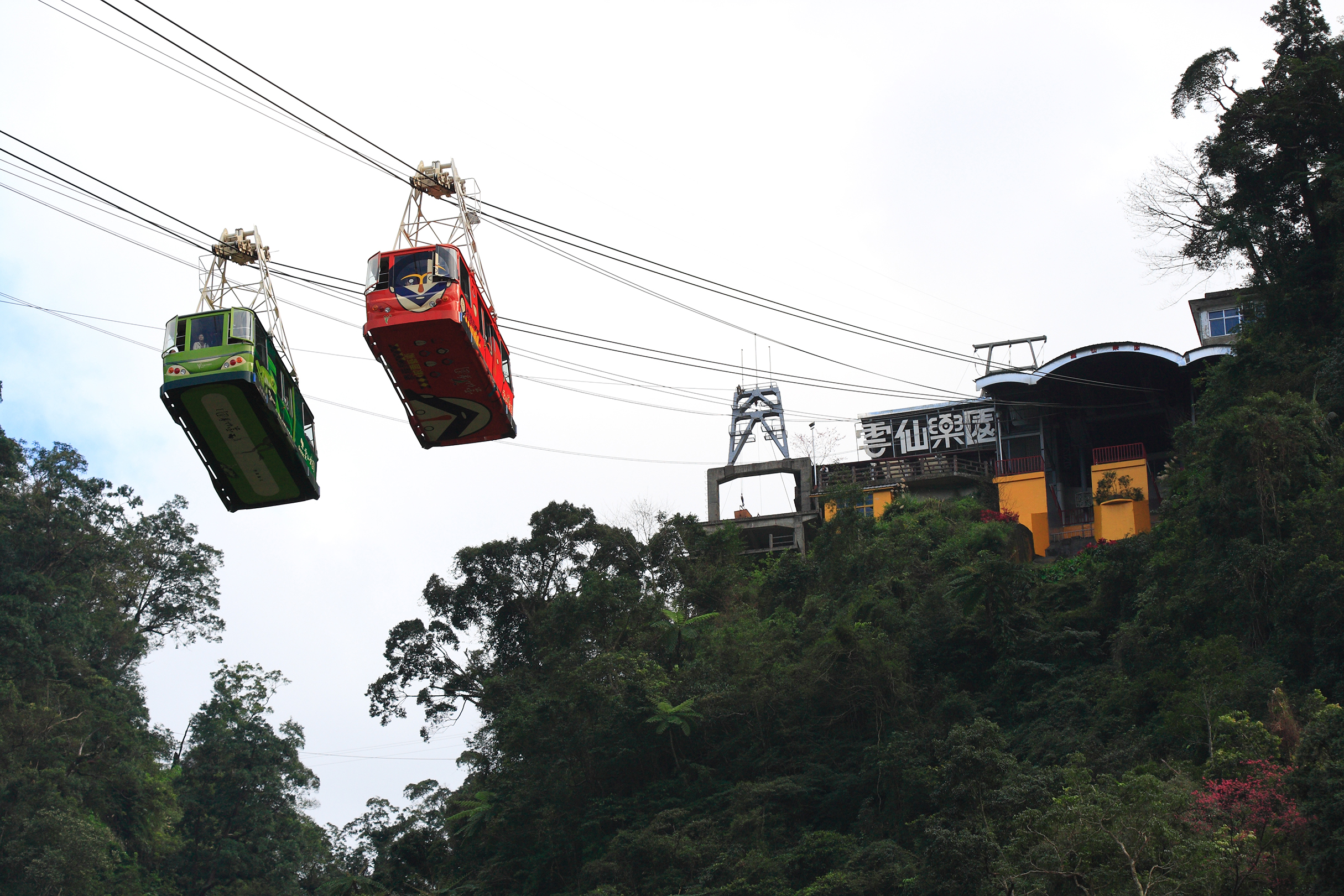
Cable cars to Yun Hsien Resort.

The resort is accessible by bus from Taipei Main Station or Xindian Station to the foot of a mountain, the followed by cable car for a length of 382 meters.

== See also ==
- List of tourist attractions in Taiwan
