= Tony Coolidge =

American film producer

Tony Coolidge (born January 9, 1967, in Taipei, Taiwan) is the producer, writer and subject of Voices in the Clouds, an award-winning documentary film.

== Early life ==
Coolidge was born in Taipei, Taiwan, to a United States Army serviceman whom he never met and Chen Yu-Chu, a woman of Atayal descent. Until the age of three, he grew up in the indigenous village of Wulai, but after his mother married another military serviceman, the family left Taiwan and began living around the world on military bases.

After initially studying pre-med at the University of Texas at Austin, Coolidge graduated with a bachelor's degree in Advertising.

== Career ==
Coolidge began his career as a graphic artist for the University of Texas at Austin and The Daily Texan newspaper, but his mother's illness prompted him to move to Orlando, Florida, in 1996, where he transitioned to Internet marketing and media. He was a partner for Orlando Online, an Internet services company that was one of the pioneers in the industry. During the Internet Boom of the 1990s, Coolidge co-founded iBidUSA.com, a B2C Internet auction company that eventually was publicly traded.

Inspired by training in Landmark Education, Tony founded the volunteer organization Katrina's Angels in response to the Hurricane Katrina disaster in New Orleans. The city of Orlando recognized Coolidge's community building efforts by inviting him to become a member of their International Advisory Committee.

In 2009, Tony Coolidge moved his family to Taiwan to gain familiarity with the island and its people and establishing himself as a 'bridge' to international opportunities.

=== Journalism ===
After his mother's death, Coolidge returned to Taiwan and for the first time discovered his indigenous heritage. He wrote an article documenting his journey to his mother's hometown of Wulai that was published in ORIENT Magazine. The article attracted filmmakers Derek Bedini and Aaron Hose, who approached Coolidge about making a documentary about his experience. Since that time, Tony has written many English-language news articles in Taiwan for newspapers and magazines, such as Asia Trend, Cultural Survival, and Taipei Times. You can read a compilation of his articles on his news article blog.

=== Indigenous Advocacy ===
In 2001, Coolidge founded ATAYAL, a nonprofit organization to share the cultures of the indigenous tribes of Taiwan. The organization hosted the Indigenous Heritage Festival at the University of Central Florida, which brought together tribal representatives from Taiwan and other parts of the world. Among them was tribal leader Alice Takewatan, who was touched by Coolidge's cultural exchange efforts.

His organization, ATAYAL, has since organized various international cultural and academic exchange projects between indigenous groups, including a project known as the Taproot Cultural Exchange Program, which brought a delegation of Māori students from the Auckland University of Technology to tour Taiwan and connect with the tribal groups on the island. In the Summer of 2017, his organization, with the oversight of Gary Smoke, Director of International Affairs, brought a delegation of Taiwanese indigenous people to Seattle, Washington to join Native Americans participating in the 2017 Tribal Journeys event. Every year around Christmas since 2010, the organization has hosted Christmas in Wulai, an annual activity that brings Christmas cheer, gifts, Santa Claus and carolers to the indigenous village of Wulai District in New Taipei City, Taiwan. Future plans for the organization include expanding resources and establishing an international indigenous network, to facilitate increased exchanges between tribes.

=== Film/Video Production ===
At her invitation, Coolidge returned to Taiwan in 2005 to film Voices in the Clouds. The film premiered at the Aruba Film Festival in June 2010, and went on to screen in over fifteen other film festivals around the world, including the San Diego Asian Film Festival and the Winnipeg Aboriginal Film Festival. Voices in the Clouds has won several awards, including Best International Indigenous Film at the 2012 Wairoa Indigenous Film Festival in New Zealand and the Golden Drum Award at the 2012 Nepal International Indigenous Film Festival in Kathmandu.

Coolidge also co-produced a short film, Time and Music in a Disappearing World, which was screened in conjunction with an exhibition of photographs taken during the filming of Voices in the Clouds. The exhibition traveled throughout Florida and Taiwan from 2005 to 2010, raising funds that were donated to the tribal elders who were the subjects of the documentary.

In 2011, Coolidge began working on Beyond Hawaiki, a documentary film about the experiences of a group of Māori students who are selected to participate in a cultural exchange program to Taiwan.

After moving to Taiwan in 2009, Tony created many projects to introduce Taiwan to international audiences. In 2017, Coolidge became the creator and producer of the On The Road with the XJ2 Crew, which is a family travel show for YouTube.

== Personal life ==
Coolidge is married to Shu-min Coolidge and has three sons. Coolidge has volunteered his time to create English-language educational programs in Taiwan. Some of his past programs included the Elite Leadership Club and the American Basketball English Camp. The basketball program cooperated with the Tainan City government in 2016, inviting Tainan City Mayor Lai Ching-te.
