= Xihu, Changhua =

Urban township in Changhua County, Taiwan

Coordinates: 23°57′34″N 120°28′48″E

Xihu Township 溪湖鎮 Sihu
- Urban township
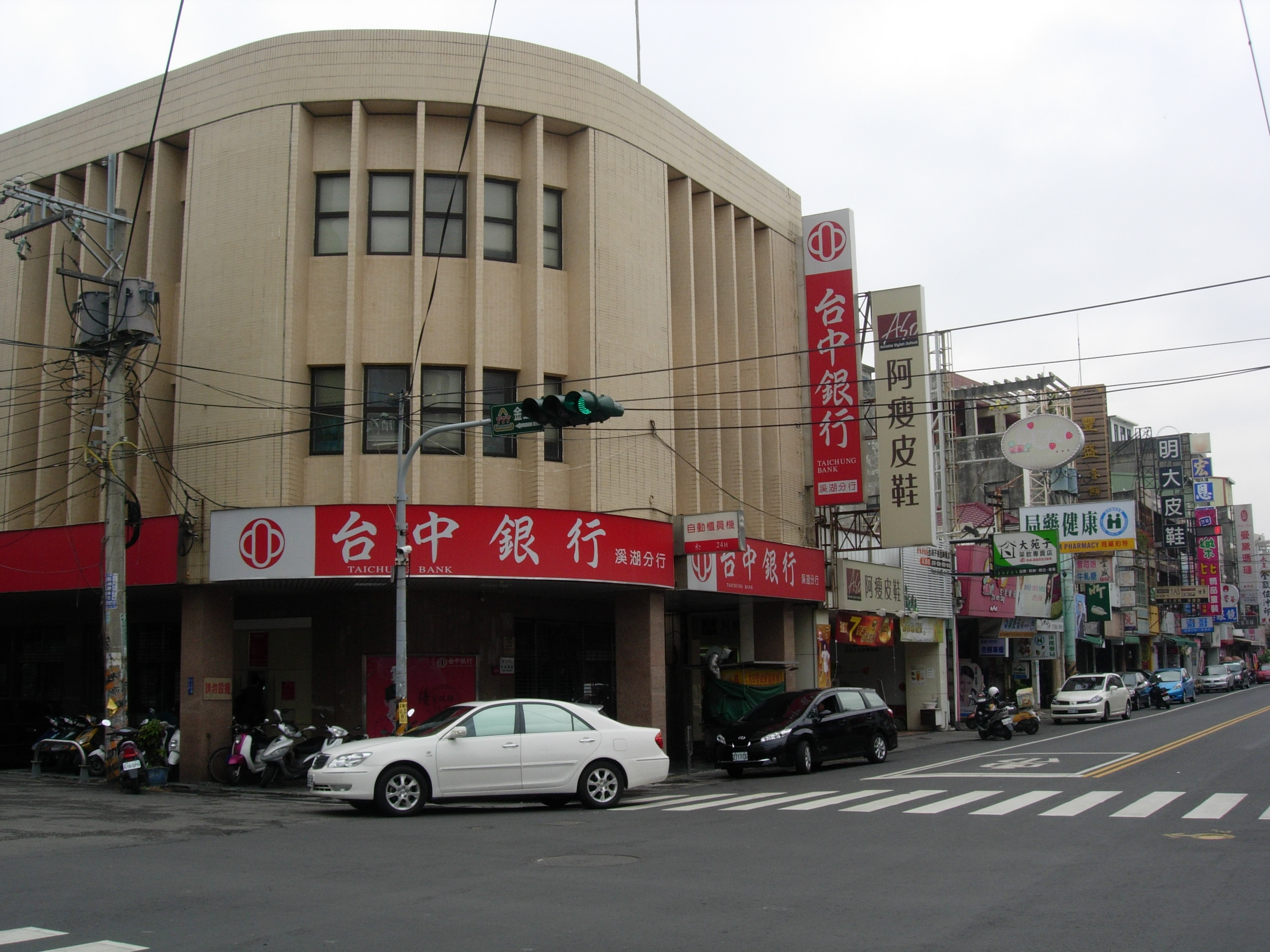

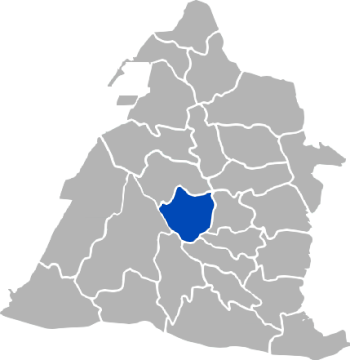
- Xihu Township in Changhua County
- Location: Changhua County, Taiwan

Area
  - Total: 32 km^{2} (12 sq mi)

Population (March 2023)
  - Total: 54,033
  - Density: 1,700/km^{2} (4,400/sq mi)
- Website: town.chcg.gov.tw/xihu (in Chinese)

Xihu, Changhua
- Chinese: 溪湖鎮
Transcriptions
Standard Mandarin
- Hanyu Pinyin: Xīhú Zhèn
Southern Min
- Hokkien POJ: Khoe-ô͘

Xihu Township or Sihu Township (Chinese: 溪湖鎮; pinyin: Xīhú Zhèn) is an urban township in the middle of Changhua County, Taiwan.

A traditional farming village, along with Xiluo, Xihu is one of the centers of vegetable-growing on the western side of the island. Famous local foods include lamb hotpot and kyoho grapes.

== Geography ==
The area of Xihu township is 32.0592 km^{2}. As of March 2023, its population was 54,033, including 27,339 males and 26,694 females.

== Administrative divisions ==
The township comprises 25 villages, which are Beishi, Biantou, Dating, Datu, Dazhu, Dingzhuang, Guanghua, Guangping, Hetung, Hutung, Huxi, Macuo, Nande, Panpo, Pinghe, Taiping, Tianzhong, Tungliao, Tungxi Village.Xiliao, Xishi, Xixi, Zhongjiao, Zhongshan and Zhongzhu.

== Education ==
The township has one senior high school (溪湖高中), two middle schools (溪湖國中, 成功國中) and five elementary schools (湖東國小, 湖西國小, 湖南國小, 湖北國小, 溪湖國小).

== Tourist attractions ==
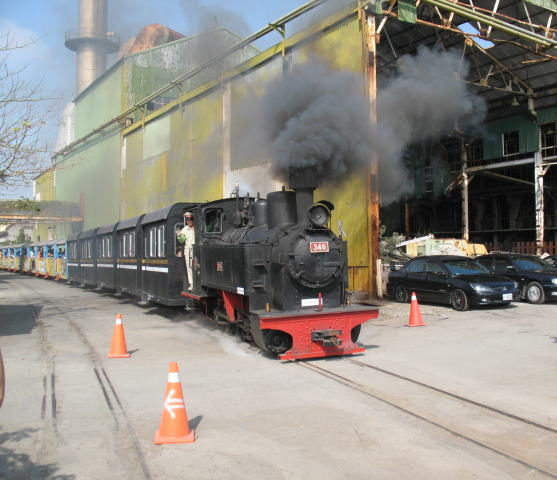
Tourist train at the former Xihu Sugar Factory

During Japanese rule, Xihu was an important center for sugar manufacturing. Because of the demand for sugar transport, a railway system was set up. At the former Xihu Sugar Factory, a tourist train featuring 60-year-old steam engine continues to operate. The locomotive is Taiwan's first unmodified steam engine, Engine No. 346.

== Transportation ==
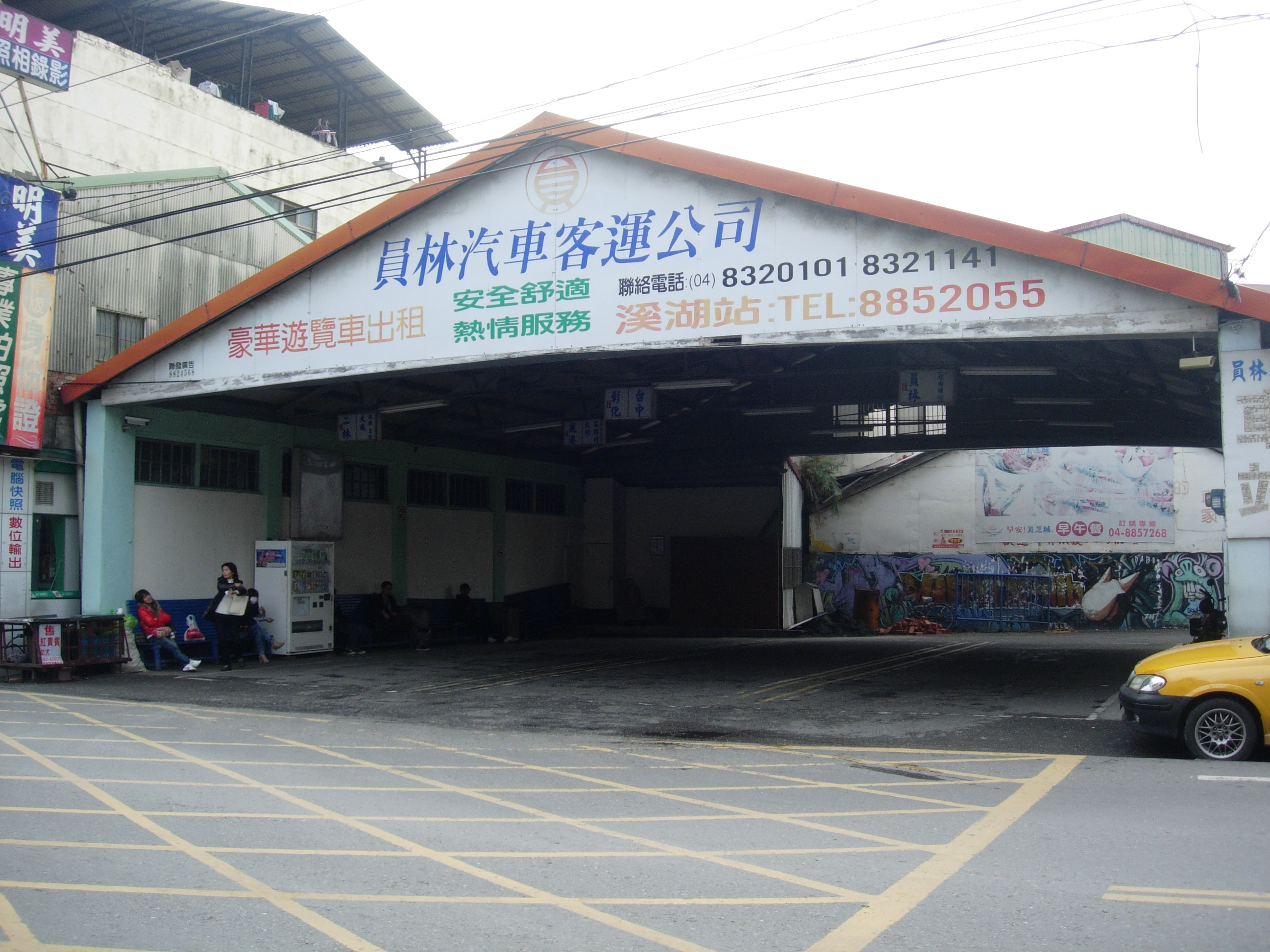
Xihu Bus Station

Xihu Bus Station is served by Yuanlin Bus.
