= Neidong National Forest Recreation Area =

Forest in Wulai, New Taipei, Taiwan

Neidong National Forest Recreation Area Chinese: 內洞國家森林遊樂區
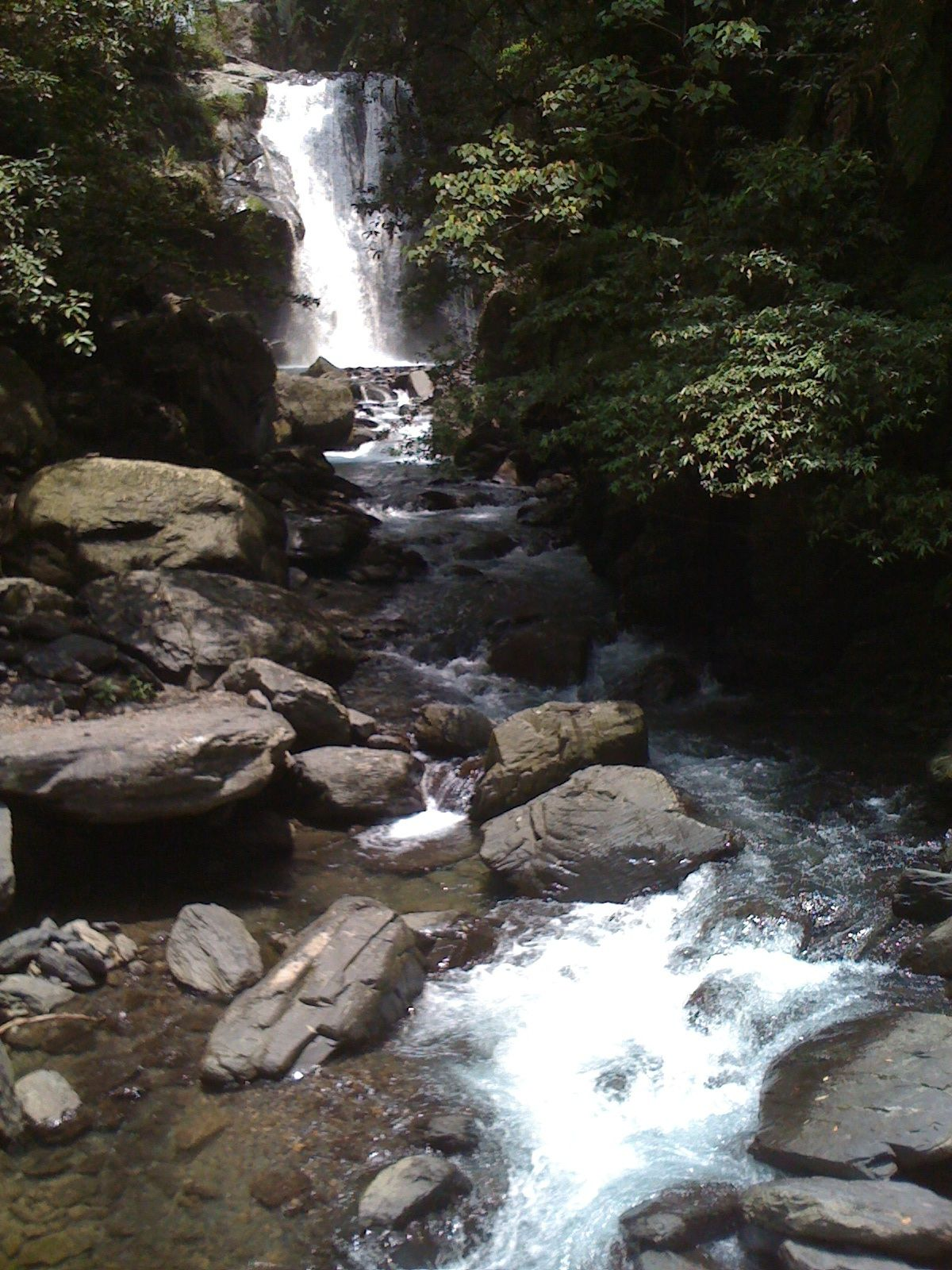

- Location within Taiwan
- Interactive map of Neidong National Forest Recreation Area

Geography
- Location: Wulai, New Taipei, Taiwan
- Coordinates: 24°49′55.2″N 121°31′36.3″E
- Elevation: 230–800 m (750–2,620 ft)
- Area: 1,191 ha (2,940 acres)

Administration
- Established: 1984

Neidong National Forest Recreation Area (traditional Chinese: 內洞國家森林遊樂區; simplified Chinese: 内洞国家森林游乐区; pinyin: Nèidòng Guójiā Sēnlín Yóulè Qū) is a forest located in Xinxian Village, Wulai District, New Taipei, Taiwan.

== History ==
The forest area was established in 1984. In August 2015, the forest was closed after it was badly hit by Typhoon Soudelor. The forest was reopened again to the public on 15 September 2018 after restoration work which costed NT$100 million.

== Geology ==
The forest is located at the intersection area of Neidong Creek and Nanshih Creek. It spreads across an area of 1,191 hectares at an elevation of 230-800 meters above sea level. It has an annual mean temperature of 20°C. It consists of moss, lichen, greenery and various animals.

== Transportation ==
The forest is accessible by bus from Taipei Main Station.

== See also ==
- Geography of Taiwan
