= Taiwan Sugar Railways =

Industrial railway in Taiwan

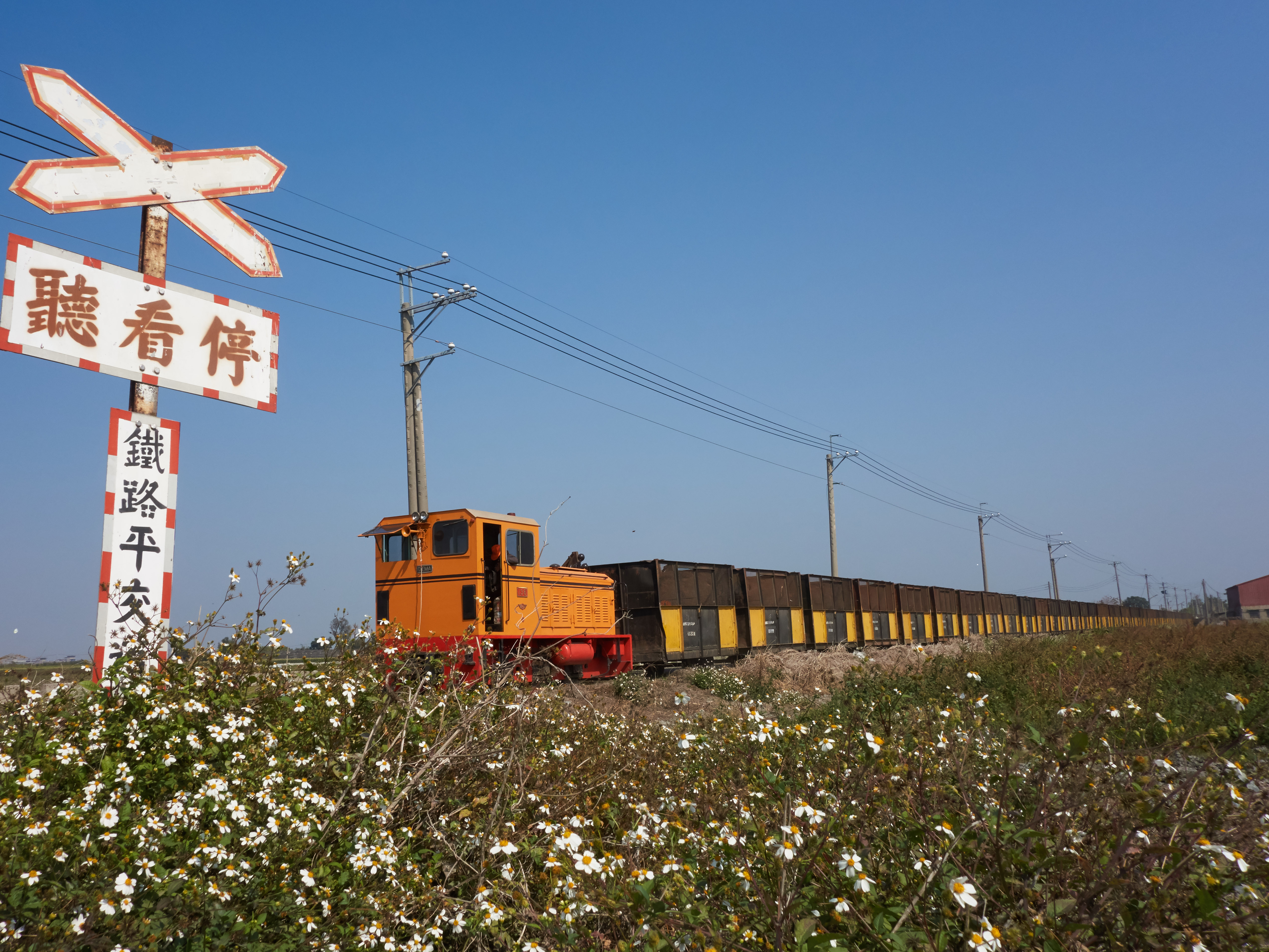
- A Sugar Railway DIEMA diesel locomotive on the Magongcuo Line

Overview
- Main region: Taiwan
- Parent company: Taiwan Sugar Corporation
- Dates of operation: 1907–present

Technical
- Track gauge: 762 mm (2 ft 6 in)

Taiwan Sugar Railways
- Traditional Chinese: 臺灣糖業鐵路
- Simplified Chinese: 台湾糖业铁路
Transcriptions
Standard Mandarin
- Hanyu Pinyin: Táiwān Tángyè Tiělù
- Wade–Giles: T'ai^{2}-wan^{1} T'ang^{2}-yeh^{4} T'ieh^{3}-lu^{4}
- Tongyong Pinyin: Táiwan Tángyè Tiělù
Southern Min
- Hokkien POJ: Tâi-oân Thn̂g-gia̍p Thih-lō͘

The Taiwan Sugar Railways is a 762 mm (2 ft 6 in) industrial railway operated by the Taiwan Sugar Corporation. The railway was primarily used in the production of sugar by transporting sugarcane to mills, but 41 lines also provided passenger service.

After the Second World War, the network reached its peak length of 3,000 km (1,900 mi), of which 675 km (419 mi) were for passengers.

From 1950 approximately 275 km (171 mi) were added: "The North-South Parallel Preparatory Line". This connected all sugar factories. However, this was quickly shortened after a natural disaster, and increasingly after each disaster. The last part closed in 1998. The only line still used to carry sugarcane today is the Magongcuo Line in Huwei, Yunlin, though five other lines are partly preserved as heritage railways.

== History ==
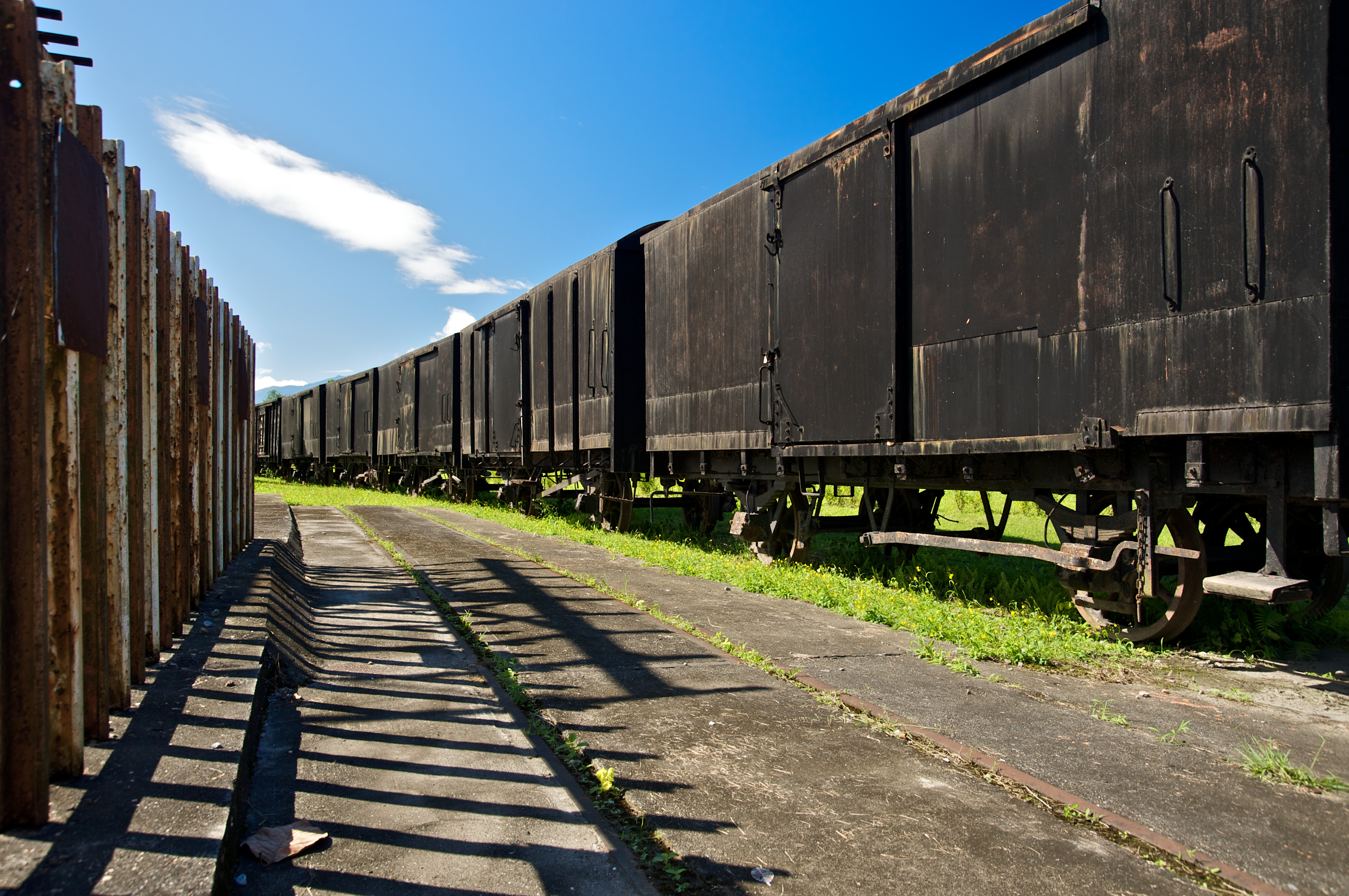
Exhibition of retired sugar-carrying trains at the Hualien plant

The Sugar Railways were initially constructed by Meiji Sugar Co., Ltd. during Japanese rule in the early 20th century and continued to operate well into the 1990s under the management of the Taiwan Sugar Corporation. During its peak, the Sugar Railways included over 3000 km of track, though by 2003 only 240 km remained. Regular passenger service was discontinued in 1982 as the need for train service to rural areas dwindled with the increasing urbanization of Taiwan and the dominance of highways. More lines were closed in the 1990s as the importance of the sugar industry decreased. Generally the remaining lines were only in operation during the sugarcane harvest season. With domestic sugarcane production dwindling in recent years, rail operations have been sporadic. Some short-distance train services resumed in 2003, now catering to tourists and residents wishing to relive childhood memories.

== Operations ==
Typically, most of the Sugar Railway lines centered on the many sugar mills in southern and central Taiwan, radiating outwards through sugarcane fields and small towns. Most of the lines were also linked with stations shared with the main railway lines allowing passengers to transfer to long-distance trains. Trains carrying sugarcane and passengers ran along the Sugar Railway lines at relatively slow speeds of roughly 10-30km/h. Locomotives were initially steam powered, but by the late 1970s the railway had converted to small diesel locomotives.

== See also ==
- Rail transport in Taiwan
- Transportation in Taiwan
