= Wulai District =

Mountain indigenous district in New Taipei, Taiwan

Coordinates: 24°52′N 121°33′E

Wulai 烏來區 Ulay
- Mountain indigenous district
- Wulai District
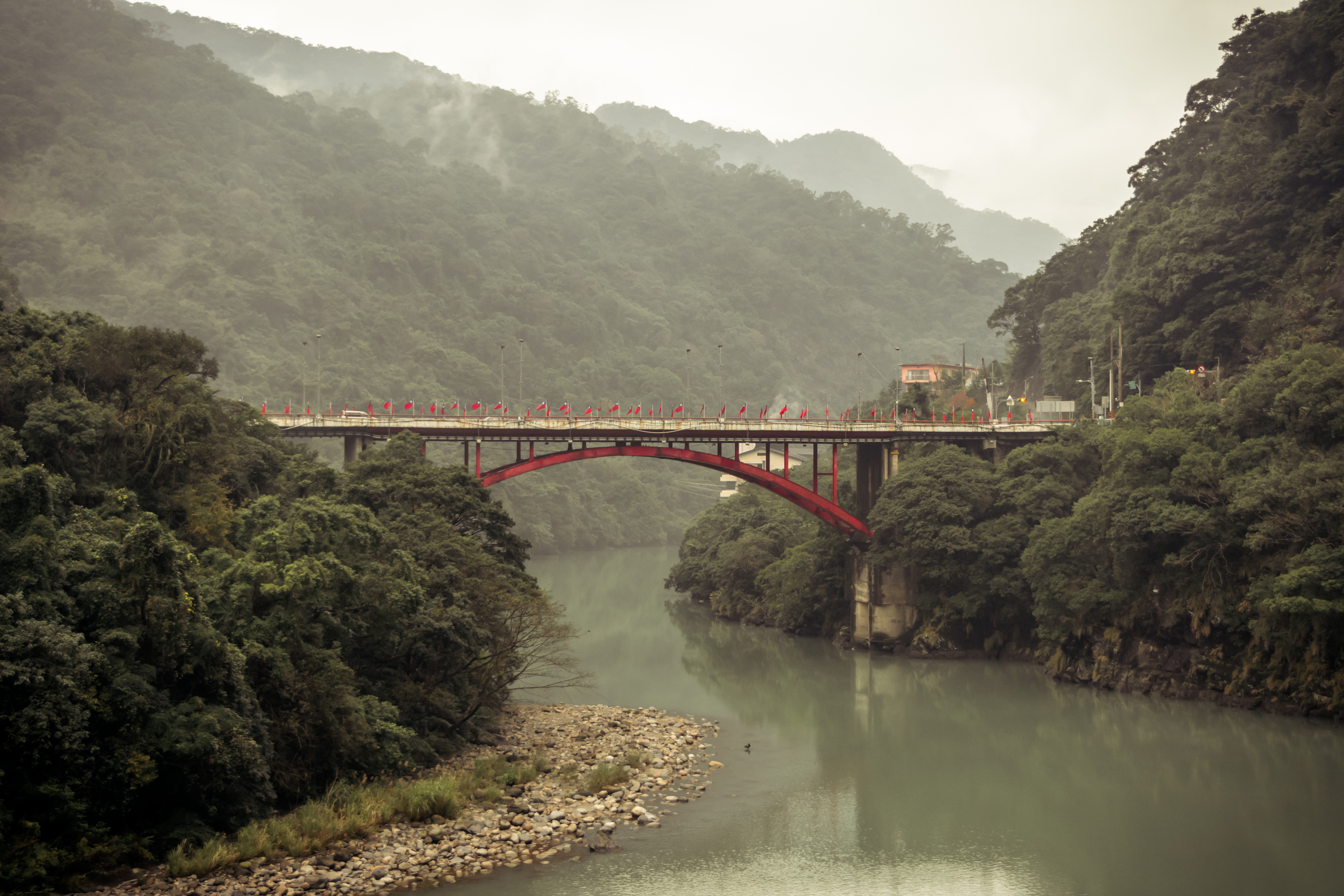

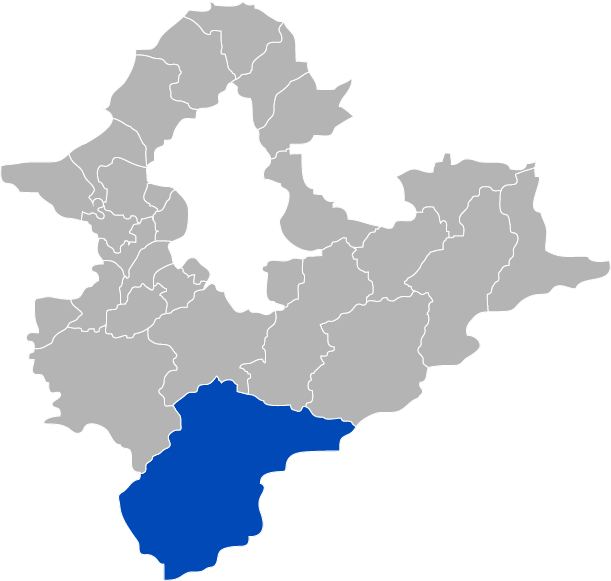
- Wulai District in New Taipei City
- Country: Republic of China (Taiwan)
- Municipality: New Taipei City
- Urban villages: 5

Government
  - Type: District government
  - District chief: Kao Fu-kuang (Ind.)

Area
  - Total: 321.1306 km^{2} (123.9892 sq mi)

Population (March 2023)
  - Total: 6,300
  - Density: 20/km^{2} (51/sq mi)
- Time zone: UTC+8 (National Standard Time)
- Postal code: 233
- Website: www.wulai.ntpc.gov.tw (in Chinese)

Wulai District (Atayal: Ulay; Chinese: 烏來區; pinyin: Wūlái Qū; Pe̍h-ōe-jī: U-lai-khu) is a mountain indigenous district in southern New Taipei City in northern Taiwan. It sits near the border with Taipei and is famous for its hot springs. It is the largest district in New Taipei, as well as the most mountainous, and is home to the indigenous Atayal people.

== Name ==
The name of the town derives from the Atayal phrase kilux ulay meaning "hot and poisonous" when an Atayal hunter hunting by a stream saw mist coming from it.

== History ==
Formerly classified as an "Aboriginal area" under Taihoku Prefecture during Japanese rule, Wulai was organized as a rural township of Taipei County after the handover of Taiwan from Japan to the Republic of China in 1945.

On June 22, 2001, President Chen Shui-bian visited a local school and hosted a graduation ceremony there.

On December 25, 2010, Taipei County was upgraded to the special municipality of New Taipei City and Wulai was upgraded to a district.

In August 2015, Wulai was devastated by Typhoon Soudelor, wiping out several hotels and destroying hot springs in the region. The course of the Nanshi River that passes through the district has since changed, with the riverbank eroded heavily by surging water. Heavy landslides were attributed to the overdevelopment of the mountain areas around the river which damaged the soil and watershed along the slope lands.

== Geography ==
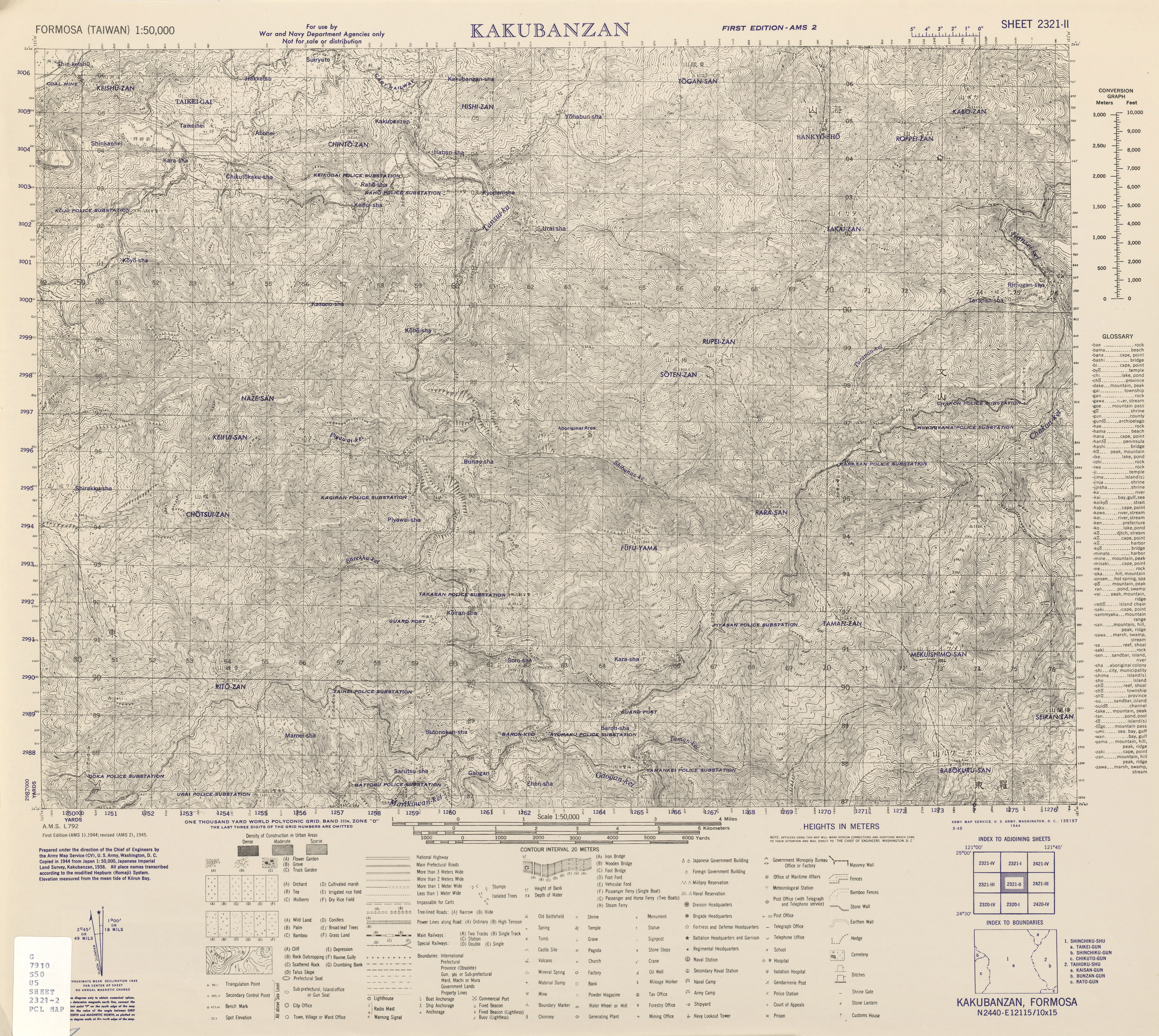
Map including Wulai area (1944)

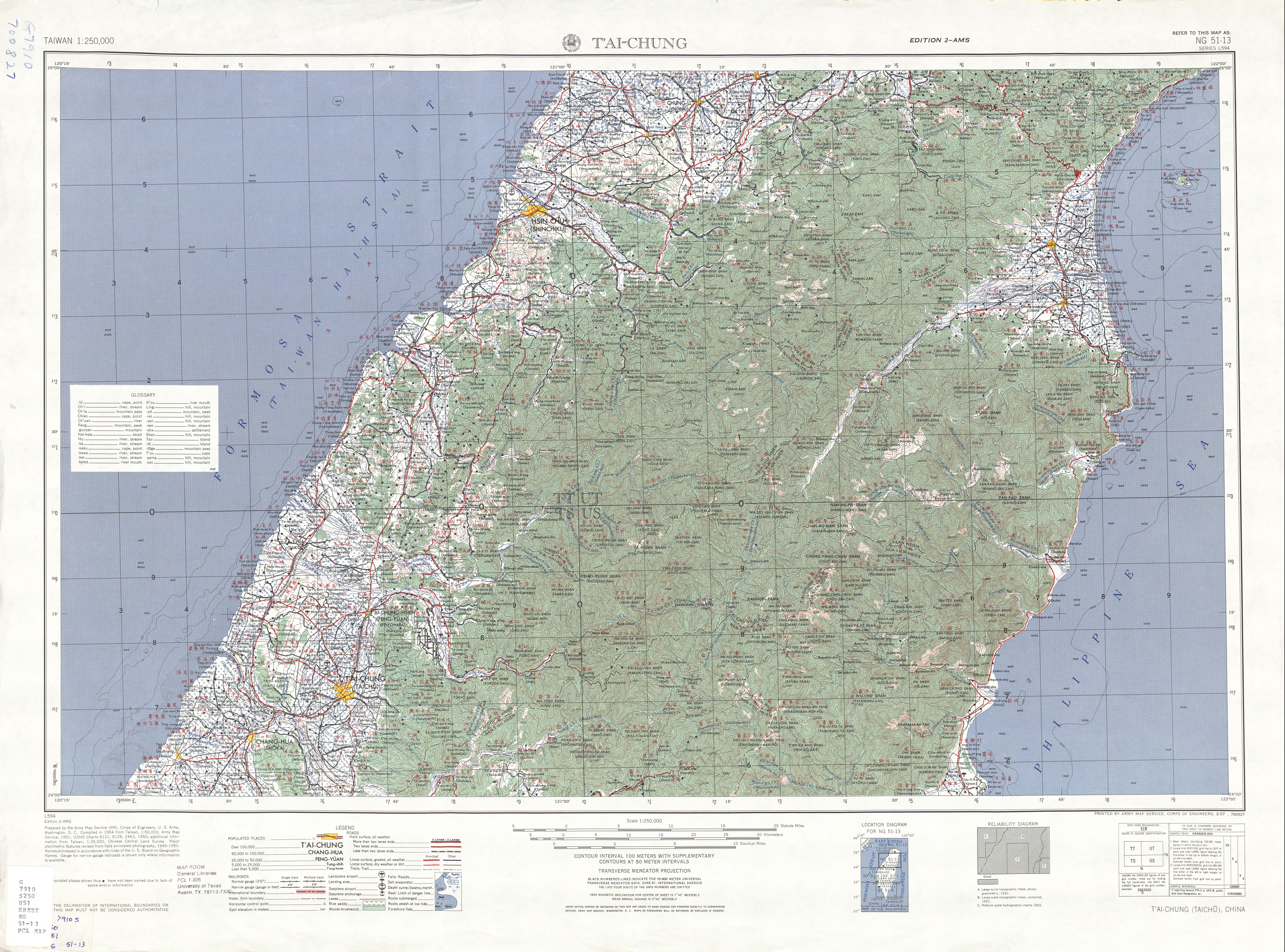
Map including Wulai (labeled as Urai-sha) (1954)

- Elevation: 250 meters (820 ft) (average)
- Area: 321.13 square kilometers (123.99 sq mi)
- Population: 6,300 people (March 2023)

== Administrative divisions ==
Wulai District is divided into five urban villages:

- Zhongzhi/Jhongjhih (忠治里), Wulai (烏來里), Xiaoyi/Siaoyi (孝義里), Xinxian/Sinsian (信賢里) and Fushan (福山里) Village.

== Tourist attractions ==
Wulai is a tourist town most renowned for its hot springs, sightseeing, and aboriginal culture. Other activities include hiking, camping, swimming, fishing, and birdwatching. During the spring, visitors come see the cherry trees bloom. According to locals, bathing in the odorless hot springs can cure skin diseases (such as ringworm, eczema, and herpes).

- Fushan Botanical Garden
- Neidong National Forest Recreation Area
- Wulai Atayal Museum
- Wulai Forestry Life Museum
- Wulai Old Street
- Yun Hsien Resort
- Wulai Hot Spring – visitors often go to the numerous hot spring hotels, public baths, as well as the Nanshi River.
- Waterfalls – Several waterfalls exist in the Wulai gorge, but the largest is Wulai Waterfall.
- Wulai Gondola – the gondola takes visitors to the top of Wulai Waterfall, where it accesses the Yun Hsien Resort.
- Atayal aboriginal culture – many shops in Wulai specialize in aboriginal foods, arts, crafts, and clothing.

== Transportation ==
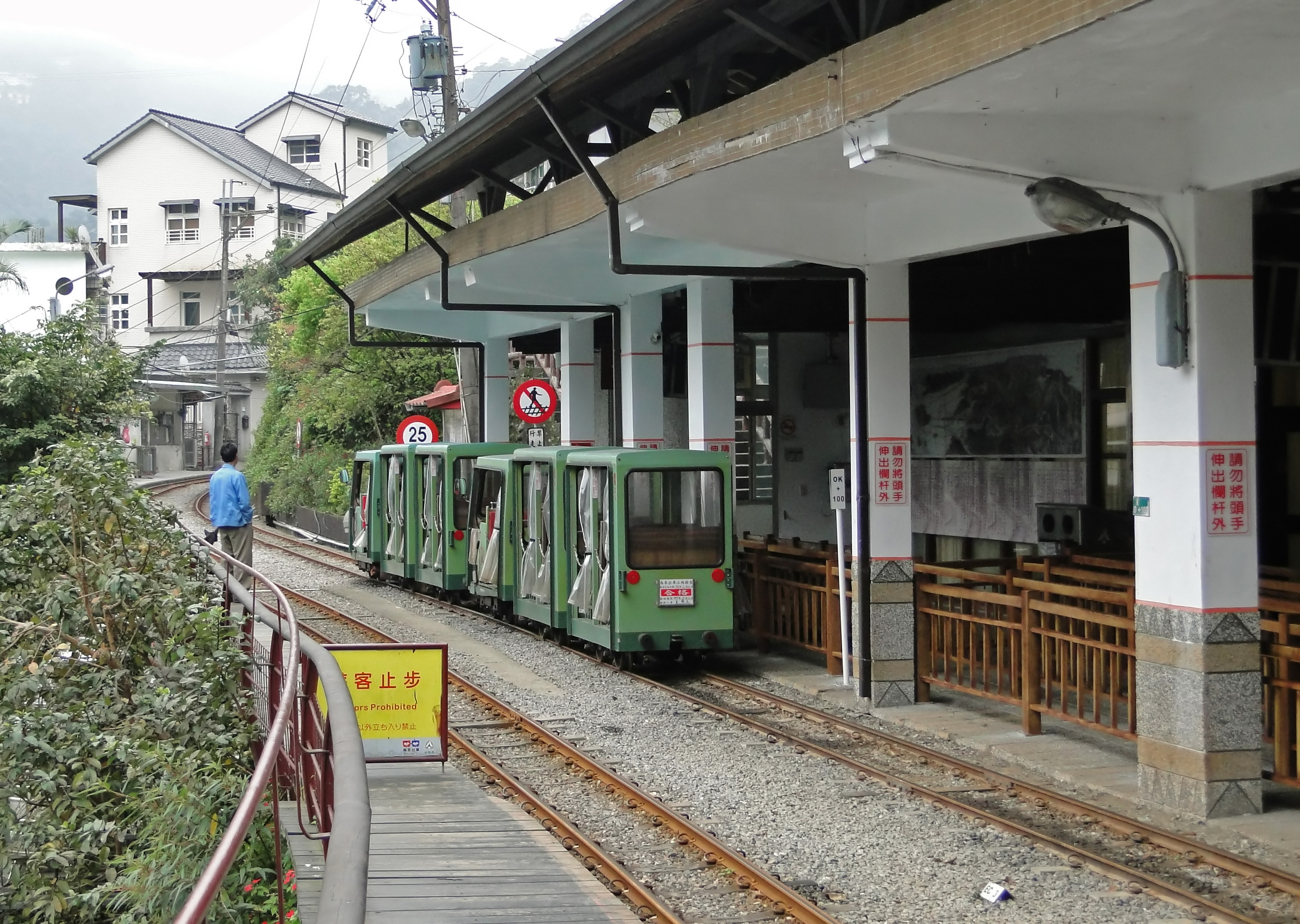
Wulai Scenic Train

=== Road ===
Wulai District is accessible by Xindian Bus from Xindian Station of Taipei Metro to Wulai Bus Terminus.

The 9A branch line of the Provincial Highway 9 passes through the district.

=== Rail ===
The district also has the Wulai Scenic Train, a converted mine train built during the Japanese era that takes visitors from downtown Wulai to the attractions at the base of Wulai Waterfall.

== Notable people ==
- Tony Coolidge (1970-), Atayal-American filmmaker

== Gallery ==
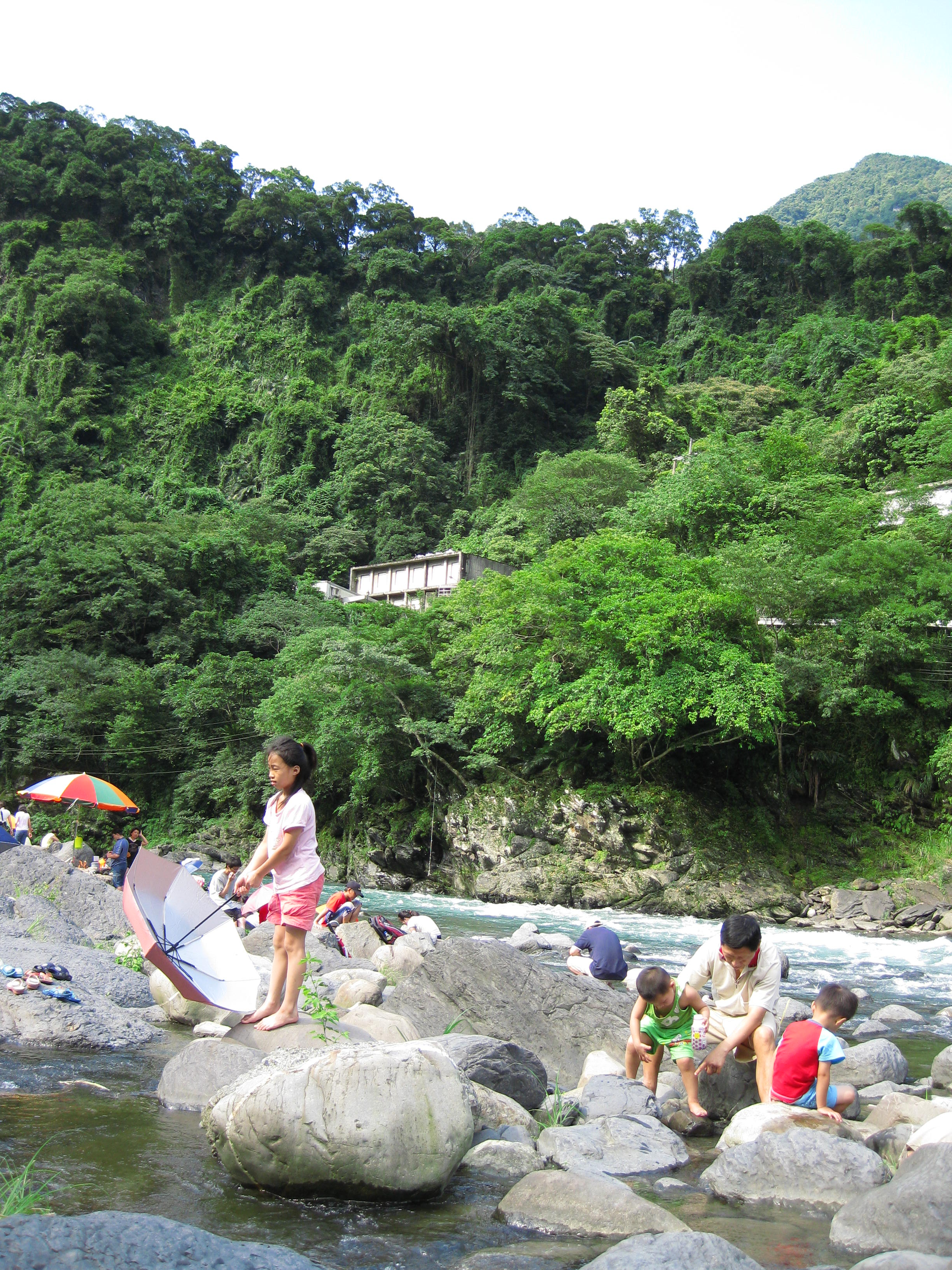
Children playing in the Wulai River

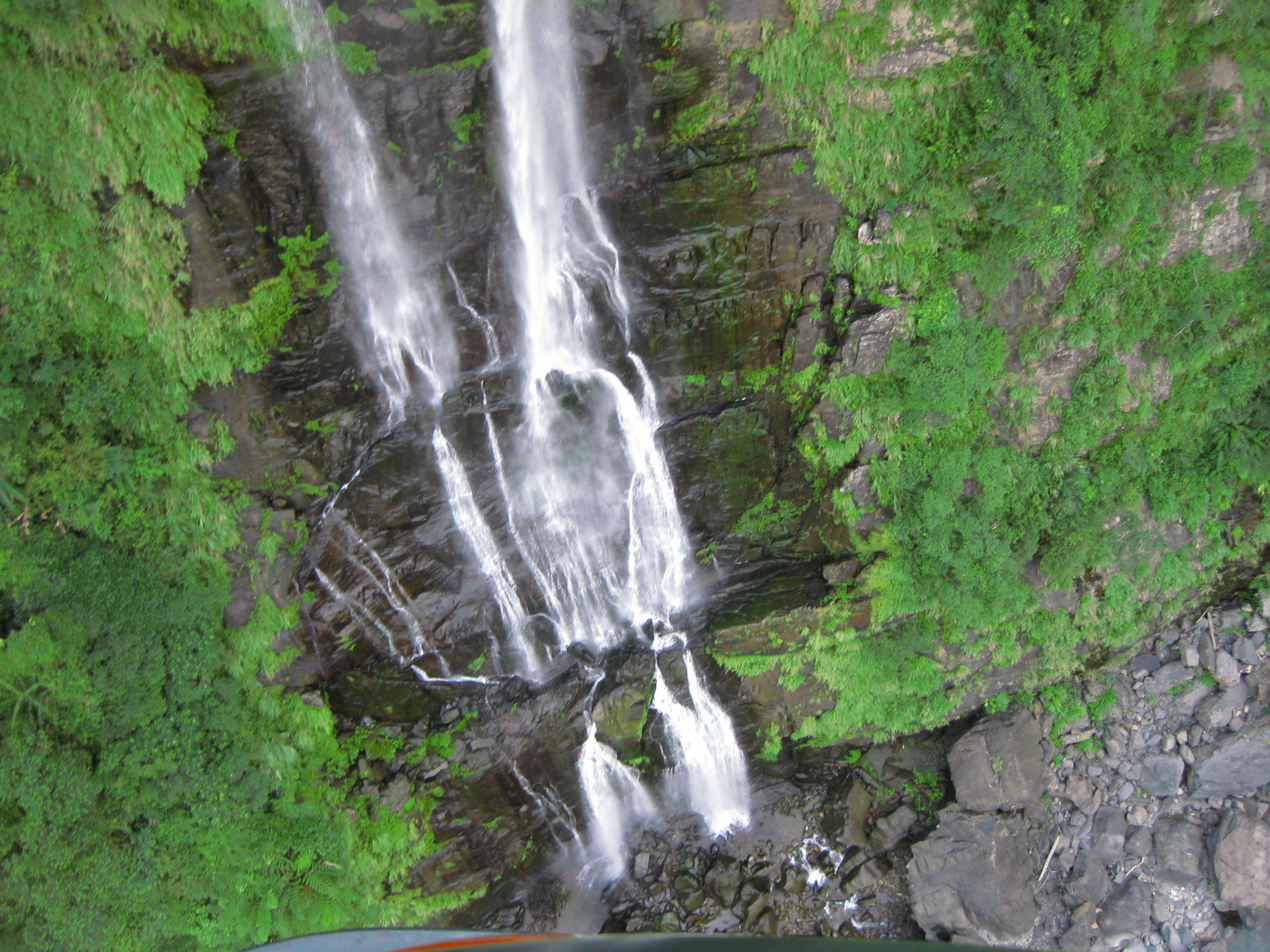
Wulai Falls as seen from above from the Gondola

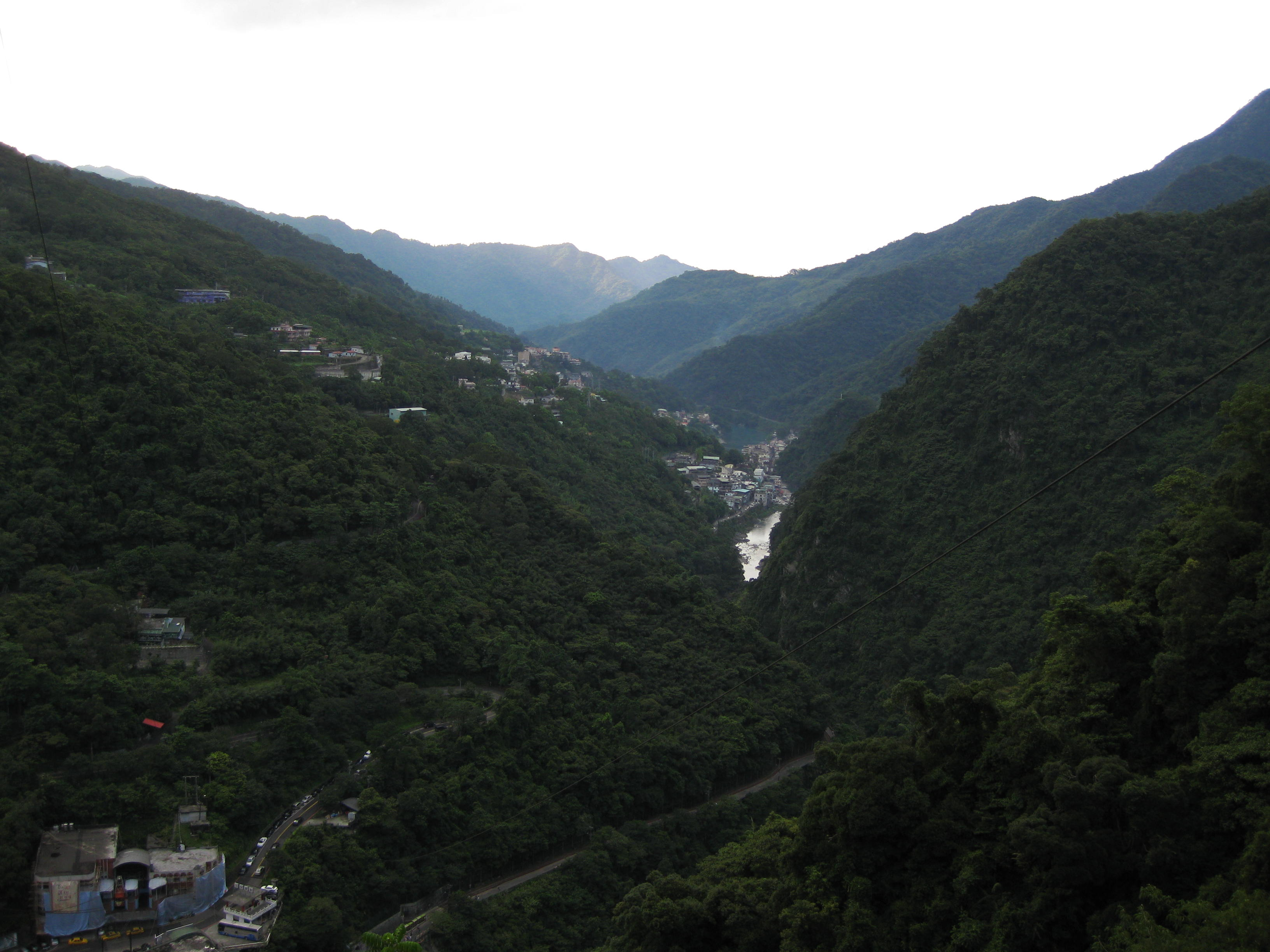
Wulai Gorge as seen from the Gondola

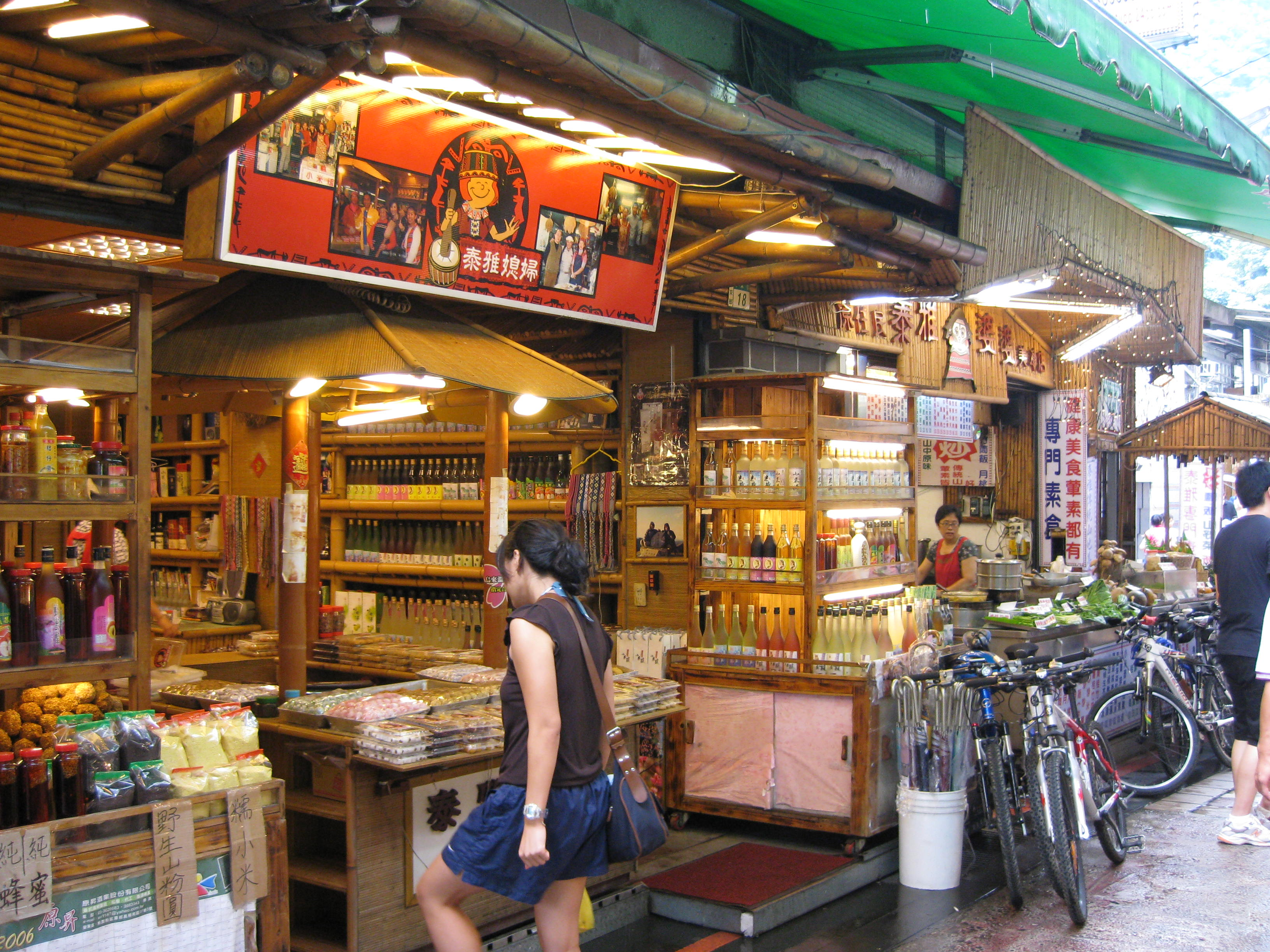
Aboriginal Shops on the main street

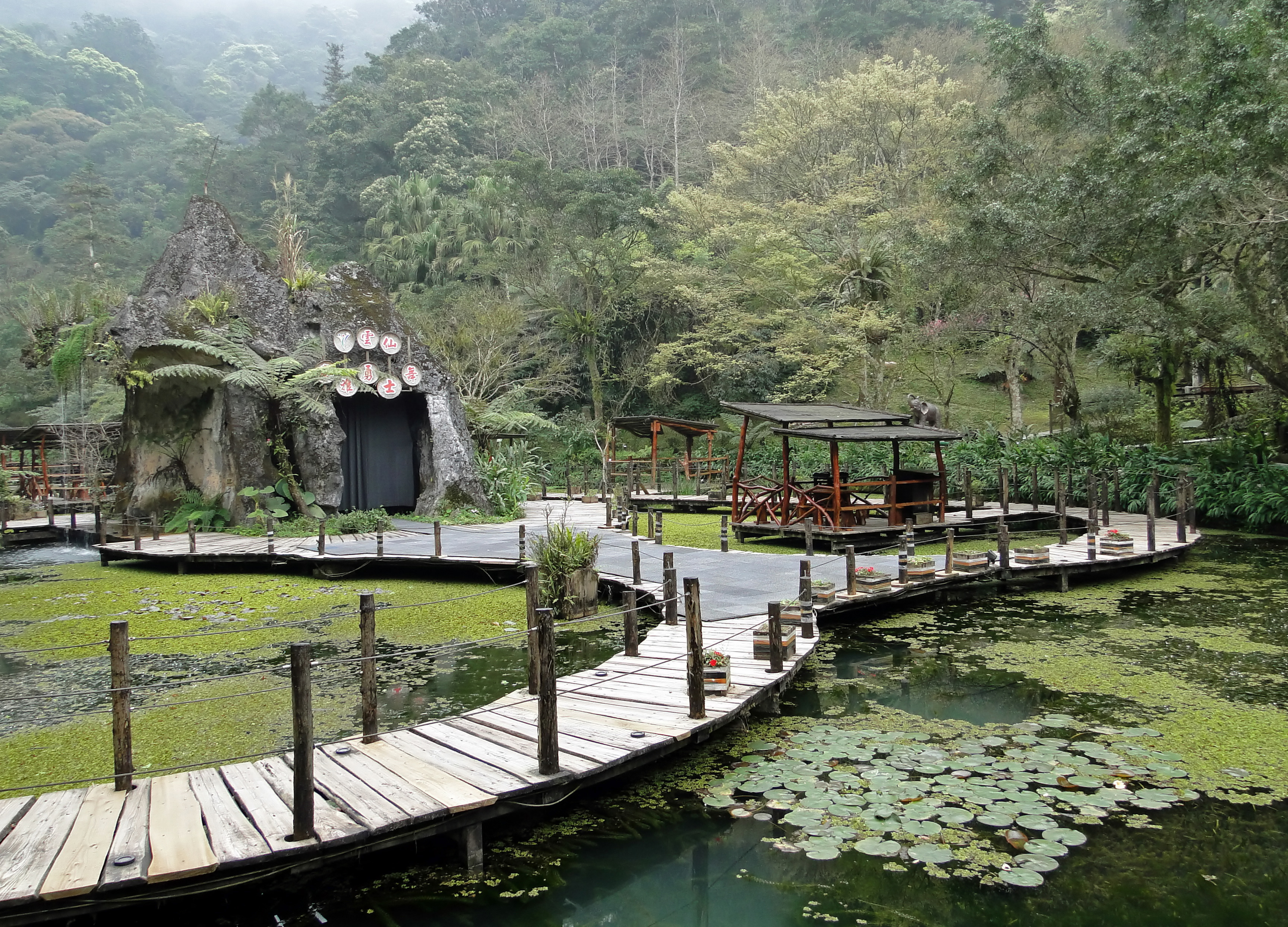
Yun Hsien Resort

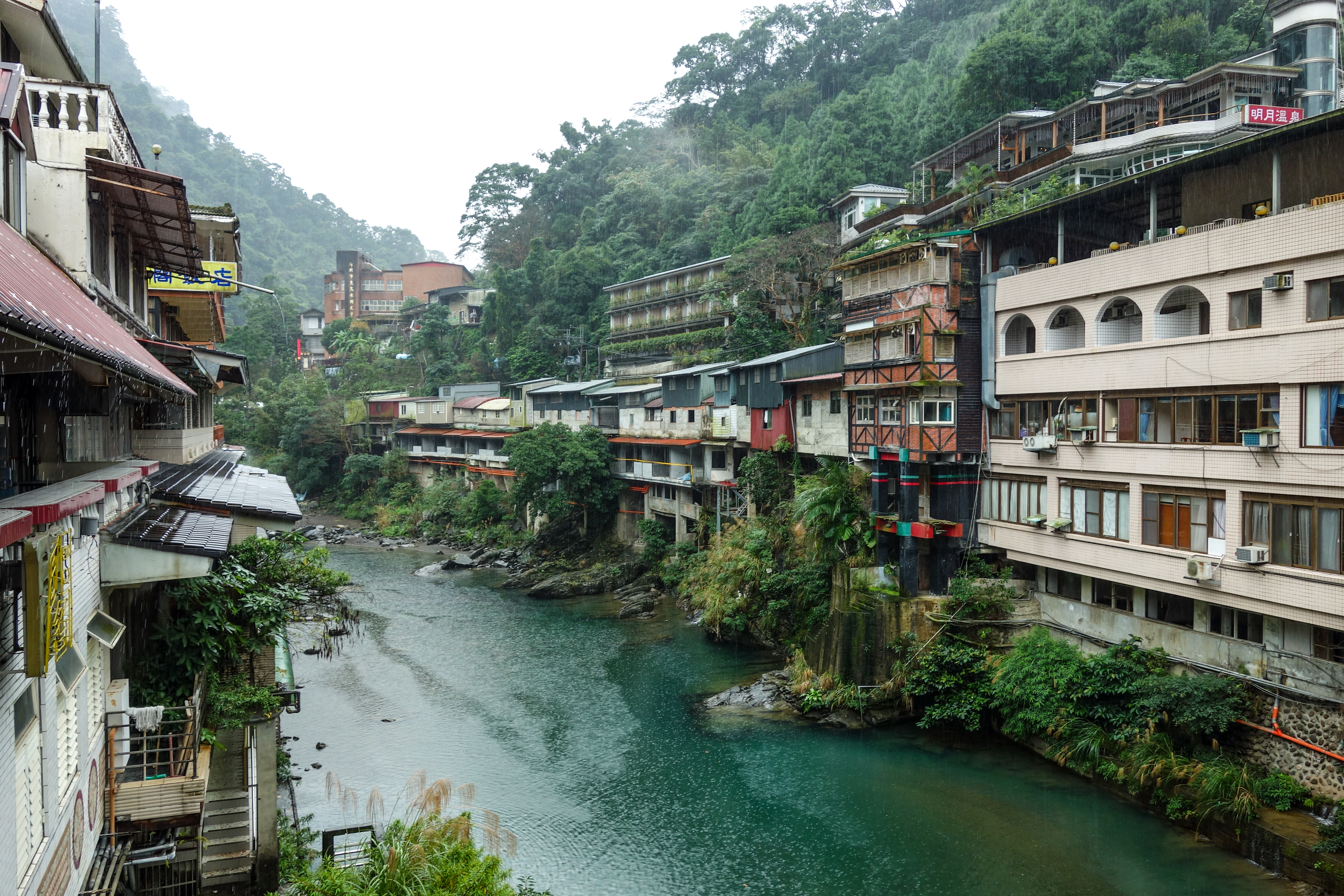
A view of the buildings around the Tonghou River.

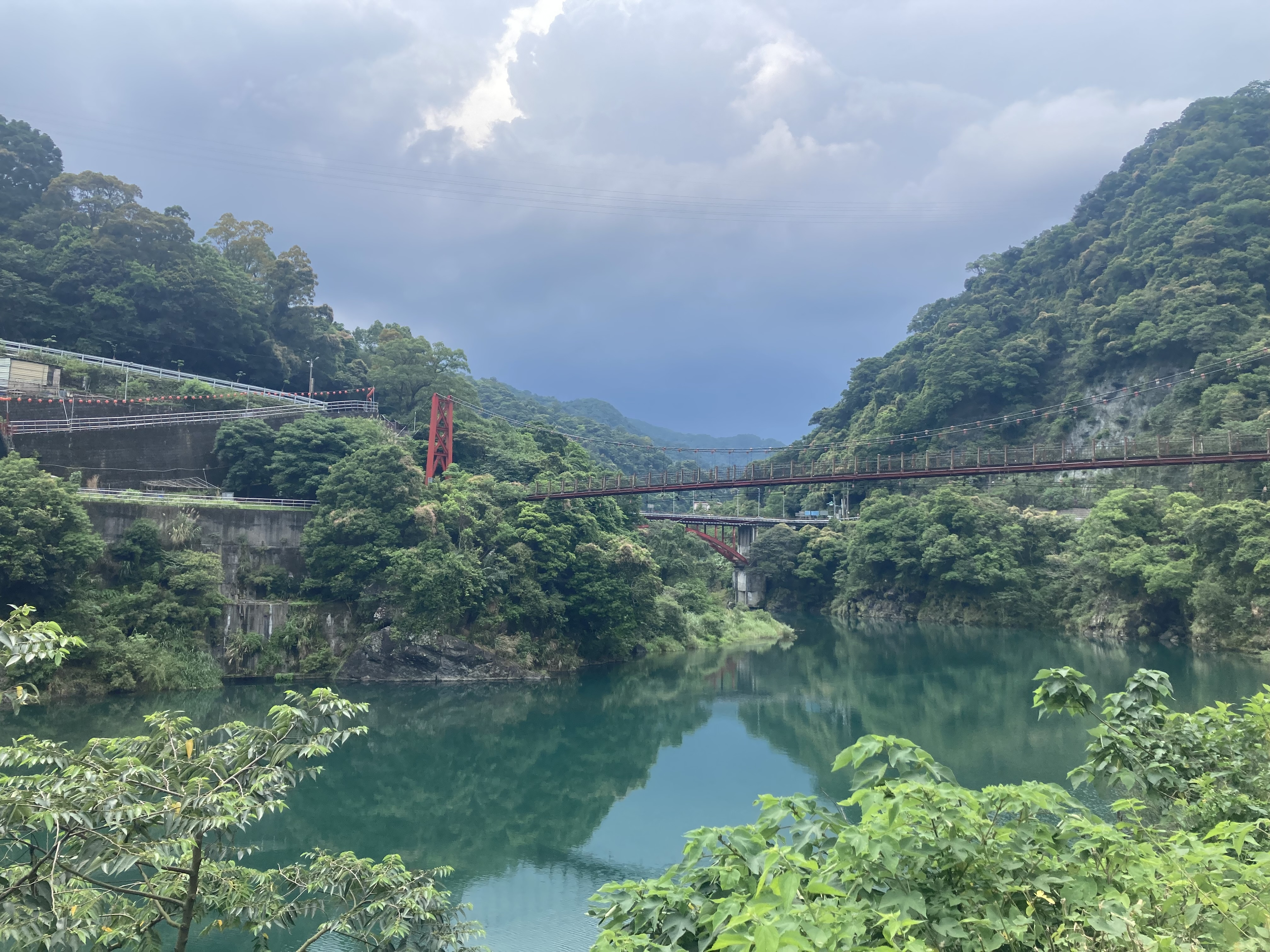
Wulai Suspension Bridge over Nanshi River with incoming storm

== See also ==
- New Taipei
