= Wulai Scenic Train =

Train in Wulai, New Taipei, Taiwan

Wulai Scenic Train 烏來台車
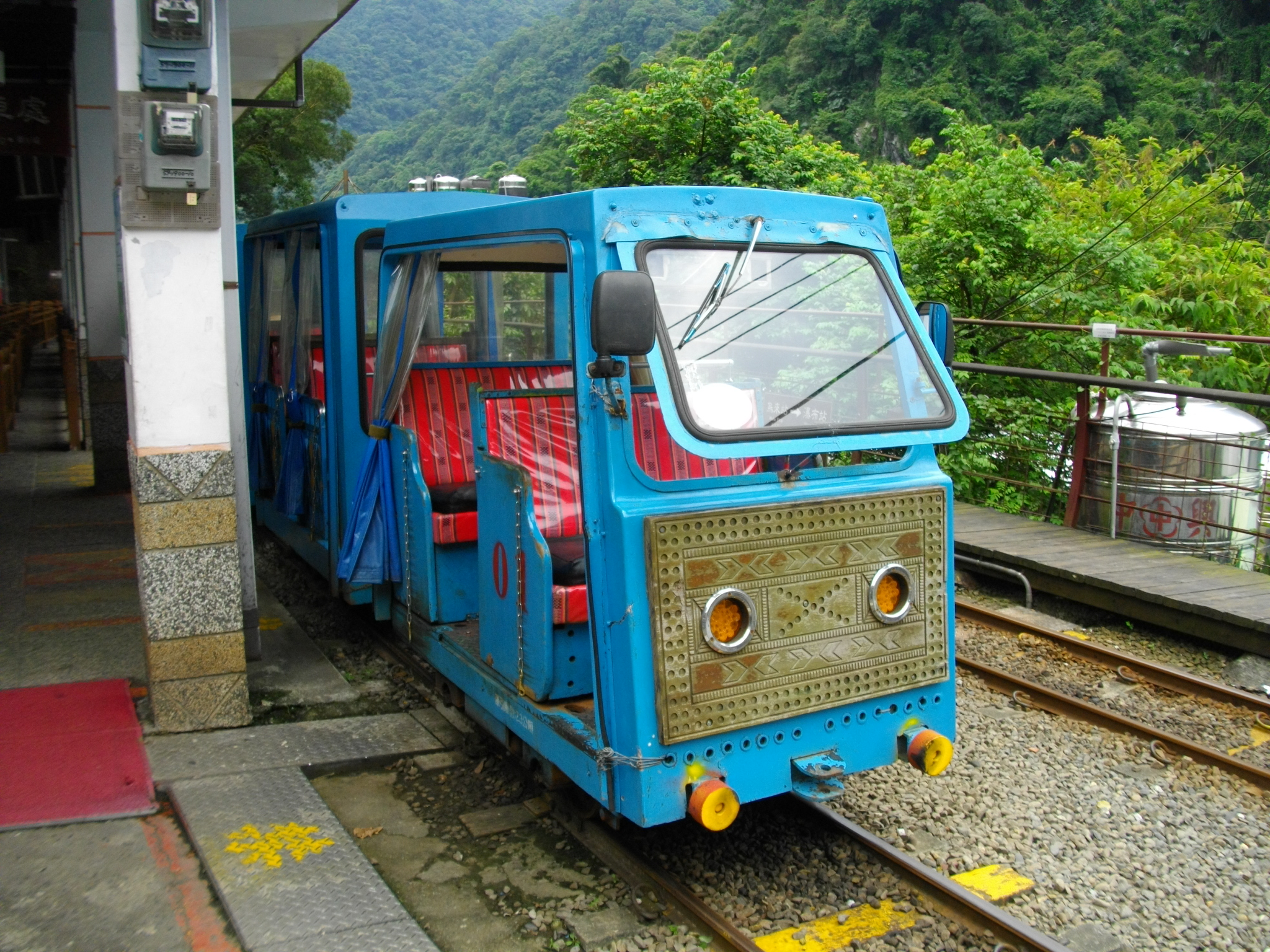

Overview
- Locale: Wulai District, New Taipei, Taiwan
- First service: 1928

Route
- Termini: Wulai stop Waterfall stop
- Stops: 2
- Distance travelled: 1.6 km
- Line used: 1

The Wulai Scenic Train (traditional Chinese: 烏來台車; simplified Chinese: 乌来台车; pinyin: Wūlái Táichē; Pe̍h-ōe-jī: U-lai Tâi-chhia), also known as Wulai Trolley, is a 1.6 km railway line in Wulai District, New Taipei, Taiwan.

== History ==
The rail cart was originally designed by the Japanese government in 1928 to transport timber, logging tools, tea and passengers. After a highway was completed in 1951, most of the railway sections were dismantled except the 1.6 km section. However, with the declining timber and logging industries, the vehicle was transformed to transport tourists. In 1964, the railway was upgraded to two tracks to increase its capacity. In 2015, the railway was closed due to damage caused by Typhoon Soudelor in which 120 meters of section was completely destroyed. It was reopened on 26 August 2017 after almost two years of reconstruction work.

== Design ==
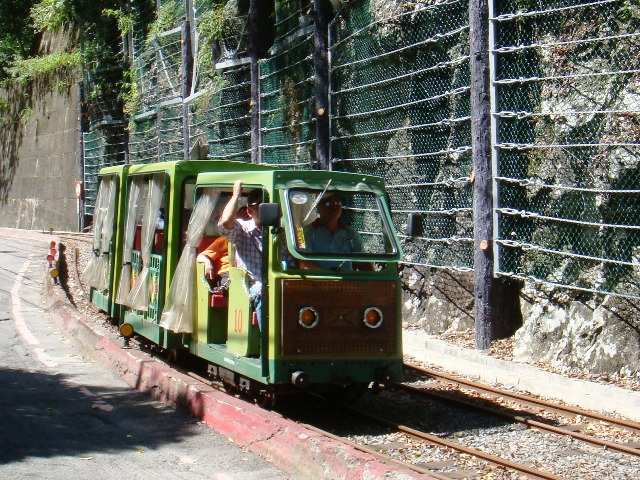
Passengers on the Wulai Scenic Train

Each cart can accommodate up to 10 passengers. The total length of the track is 1.6 km.

== List of stations ==
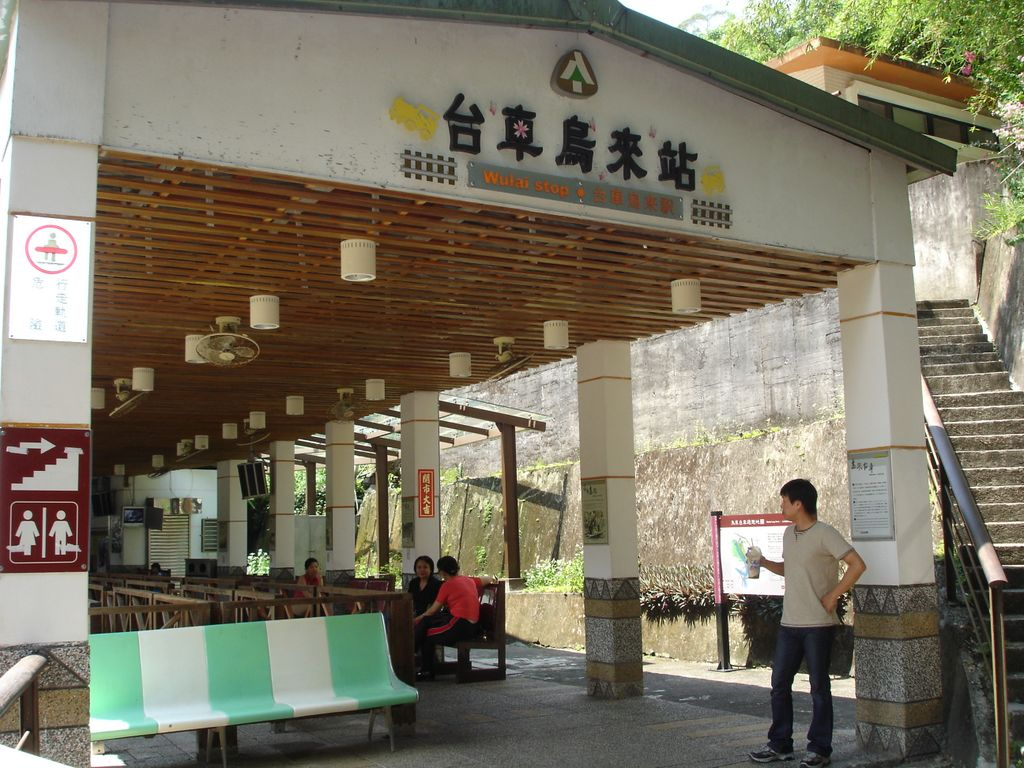
Wulai stop in 2008

Name	Chinese	Taiwanese	Hakka	Atayal	Distance (km)	Location	
Wulai stop	烏來	U-lai	Vû-lòi	Ulay	0.1	Wulai	New Taipei
Waterfall stop	瀑布	Pho̍k-pò͘	Phau-pu	Tgliq	1.5	Wulai	New Taipei

== Transportation ==
The railway is accessible by bus from Xindian Station of Taipei Metro.

== See also ==
- Rail transport in Taiwan
- List of railway stations in Taiwan
