= Luodong Forest Railway =

Coordinates: 24.662518°N 121.619969°E

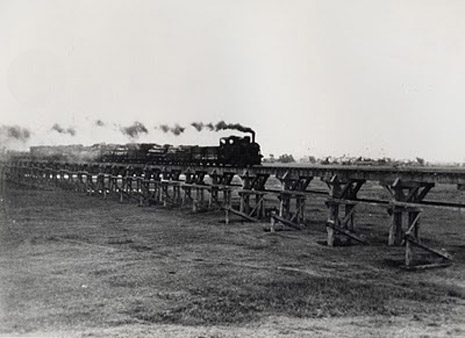
- Luodong Forest Railway

Technical
- Line length: 36.4 km (22.6 miles)
- Track gauge: 2 ft 6 in (762 mm)

The Luodong Forest Railway or Bong Bong Train (traditional Chinese: 羅東森林鐵路; simplified Chinese: 罗东森林铁路; pinyin: Luódōng Sēnlín Tiělù) was a 36.4 km (22.6 miles) long narrow gauge forest railway with a gauge of 2 ft 6 in (762 mm) near Luodong in Yilan County, Taiwan. The track was opened in 1924 and closed in 1979. A section will be re-used for tourist trains.

== History ==
The Luodong Forest Railway was inaugurated on 27 January 1924 for goods services. Passenger transport commenced in May 1926 with 10 stations.

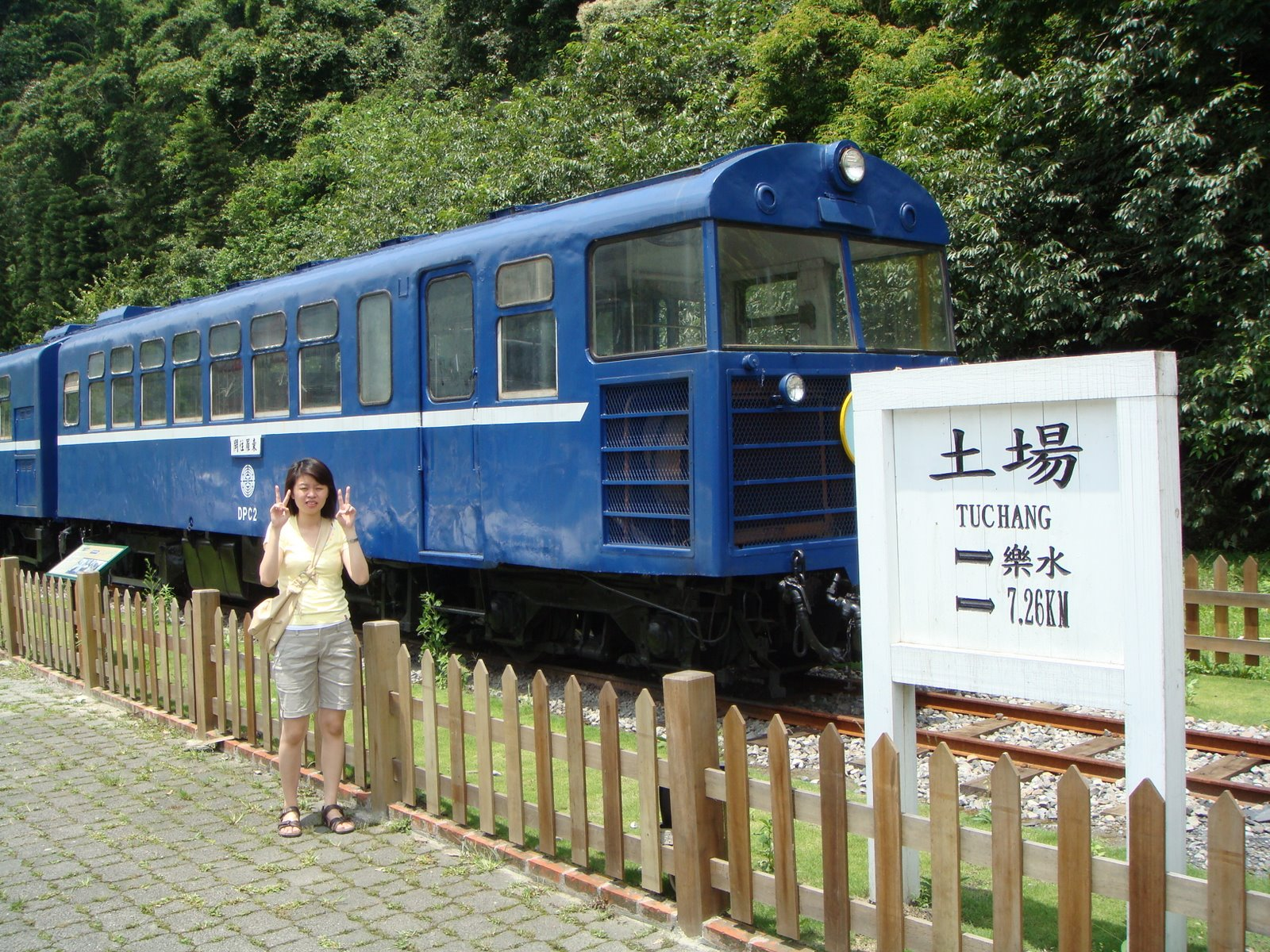
Diesel Passenger Car of Luodong-Waldbahn, re-used on Alishan Forest Railway

In 1970 Lin-Tailong railway station north of Luodong railway station was inaugurated. Chinese diesel rail cars were introduced in 1971, to improve the quality for the passengers while reducing the operating cost. The goods volume of forest produce declined after 1976, and passenger transport lost in importance due to increasing road traffic.

The track required many wooden bridges, and as a consequence it was prone to flood damage. Thus the track was de-commissioned on 1 August 1979 after 56 years of service. In August 2019, Wu Tze-cheng stated that the railway would be rebuilt in two phases, for a total cost of NT$8 million.

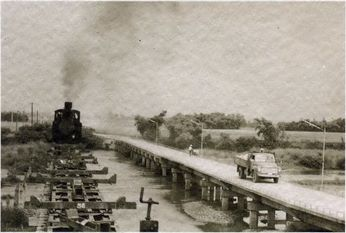
Luodong Forest Railway on the Tsaiqiao Bridge

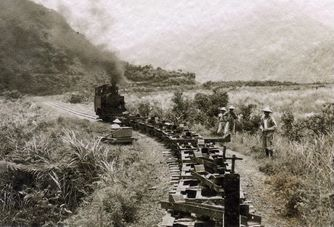
Alishan Forest Railway

== Track ==
The railway was an extension of the Taiping Mountain Forest Railway. There were ten stations along the track, which passed seven tunnels and 17 or 22 bridges. A single trip lasted approximately 2 hours and 50 minutes.

Name	Chinese	Taiwanese	Hakka	Distance (km)	Transfers and Notes	Location	
Lo-tung	羅東	Lô-tong	Lò-tûng	-0.6	Yilan line: Luodong	Luodong	Yilan
Chu-lin	竹林	Tek-lîm	Chuk-lìm	0.0		Luodong	Yilan
Wai-tzŭ-wai	歪仔歪	Oai-á-oai	Vâi-è-vâi	3.04		Luodong	Yilan
Ta-chou	大洲	Toā-chiu	Thai-chû	5.92		Sanxing	Yilan
Wan-fu	萬富	Bān-pù	Van-fu	10.24		Sanxing	Yilan
San-hsing	三星	Saⁿ-chheⁿ/chhiⁿ	Sâm-sên	14.50		Sanxing	Yilan
Tien-sung-pʻi	天送埤	Thian-sàng-pi	Thiên-sung-phî	18.02	Limited tourist service around station	Sanxing	Yilan
Chʻing-shui-hu	清水湖	Chheng-chúi-ô͘	Tshîn-súi-fù	21.38		Sanxing	Yilan
Niu-tou	牛鬥	Gû-tàu	Ngiù-teu	23.78		Sanxing	Yilan
Lê-shui	樂水	Lo̍k-chúi	Lo̍k-súi	29.38		Datong	Yilan
Tʻu-chʻang	土場	Thô͘-tiûⁿ	Thú-chhòng	36.64	→ Taiping Mountain Forest Railway	Datong	Yilan

== Preserved buildings ==
The rails were lifted and scrapped after de-commissioning, and the bridges and tunnels collapsed over time. There are still some railway station buildings and similar buildings as well as tunnels, dams and bridge pillars, of which some are listed as cultural heritage.

Tunnel No 8 of 1921 is still in sound condition fertiggestellte Tunnel Nr. 8 is well preserved and has been listed in July 2012 as a Grade II listed historic building. It is near the Lan Yang CreekDamm, approximately 350 metres off the settlement of the Zhiban tribe. It is only 40 m (44 yards) long. At its entrance are concrete vaults and in other areas solid rock of slate. The interior was originally reinforced by wooden struts which have disappeared over time.

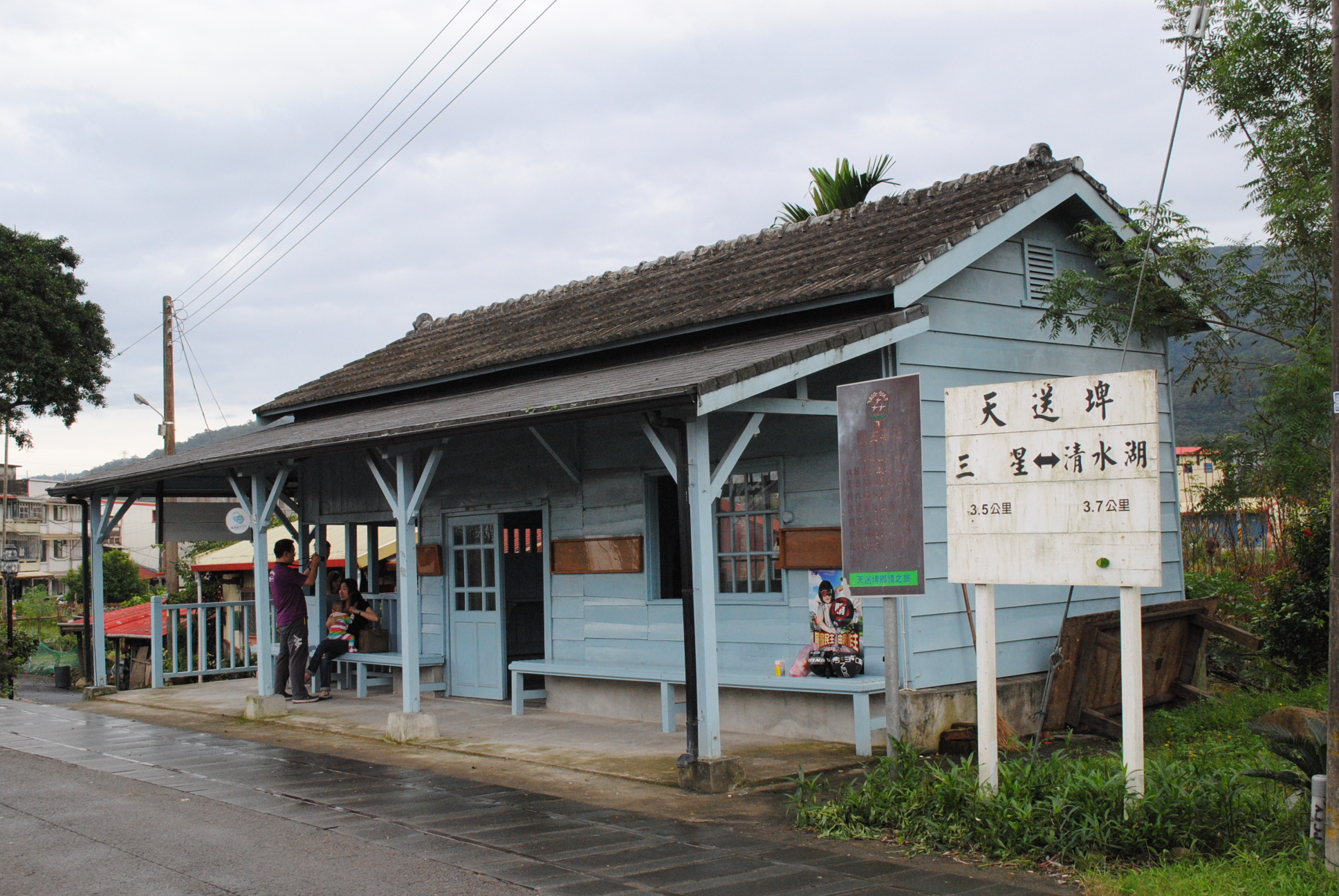
Tien-sung-pi railway station

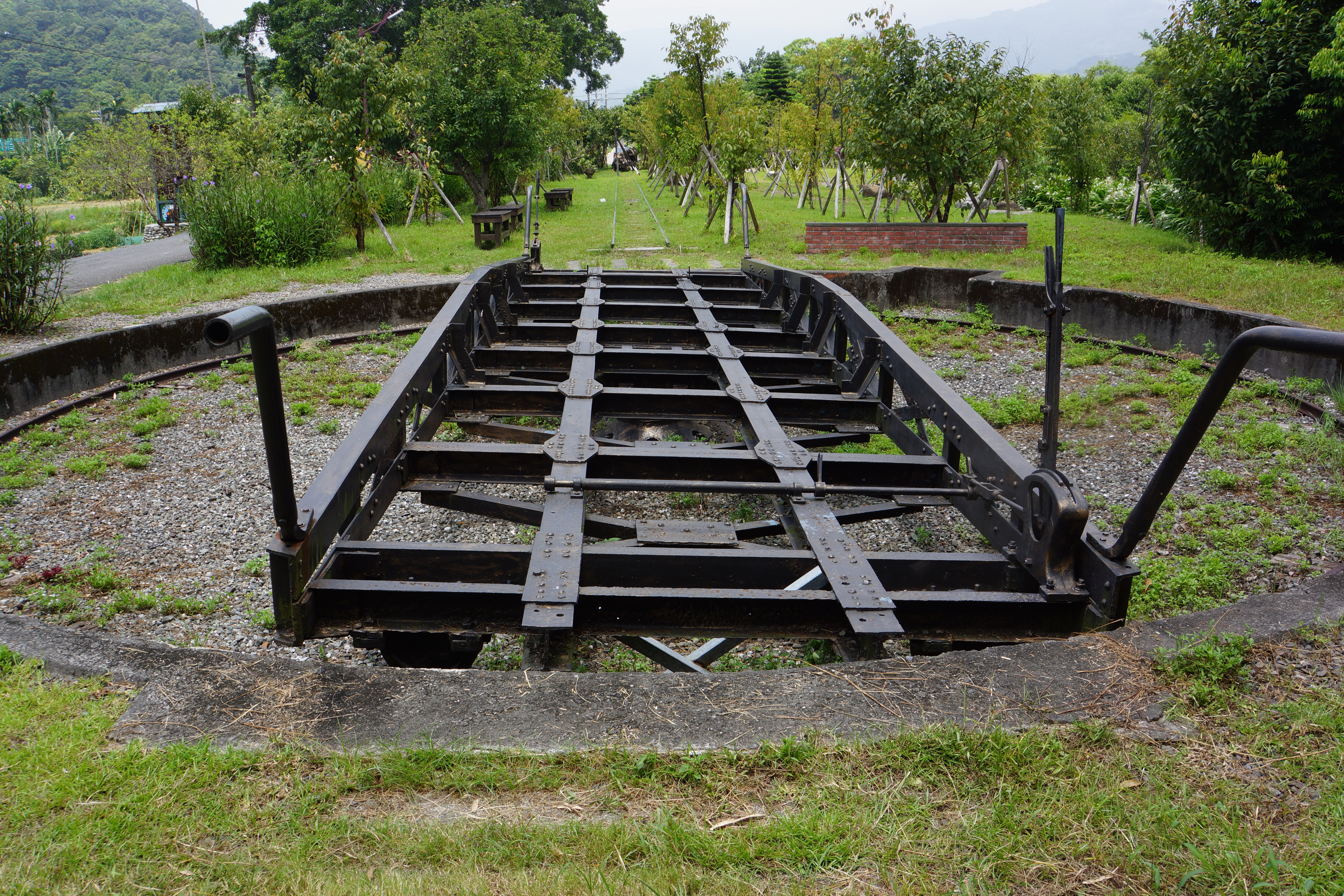
Turntable in Tien-sung-pi

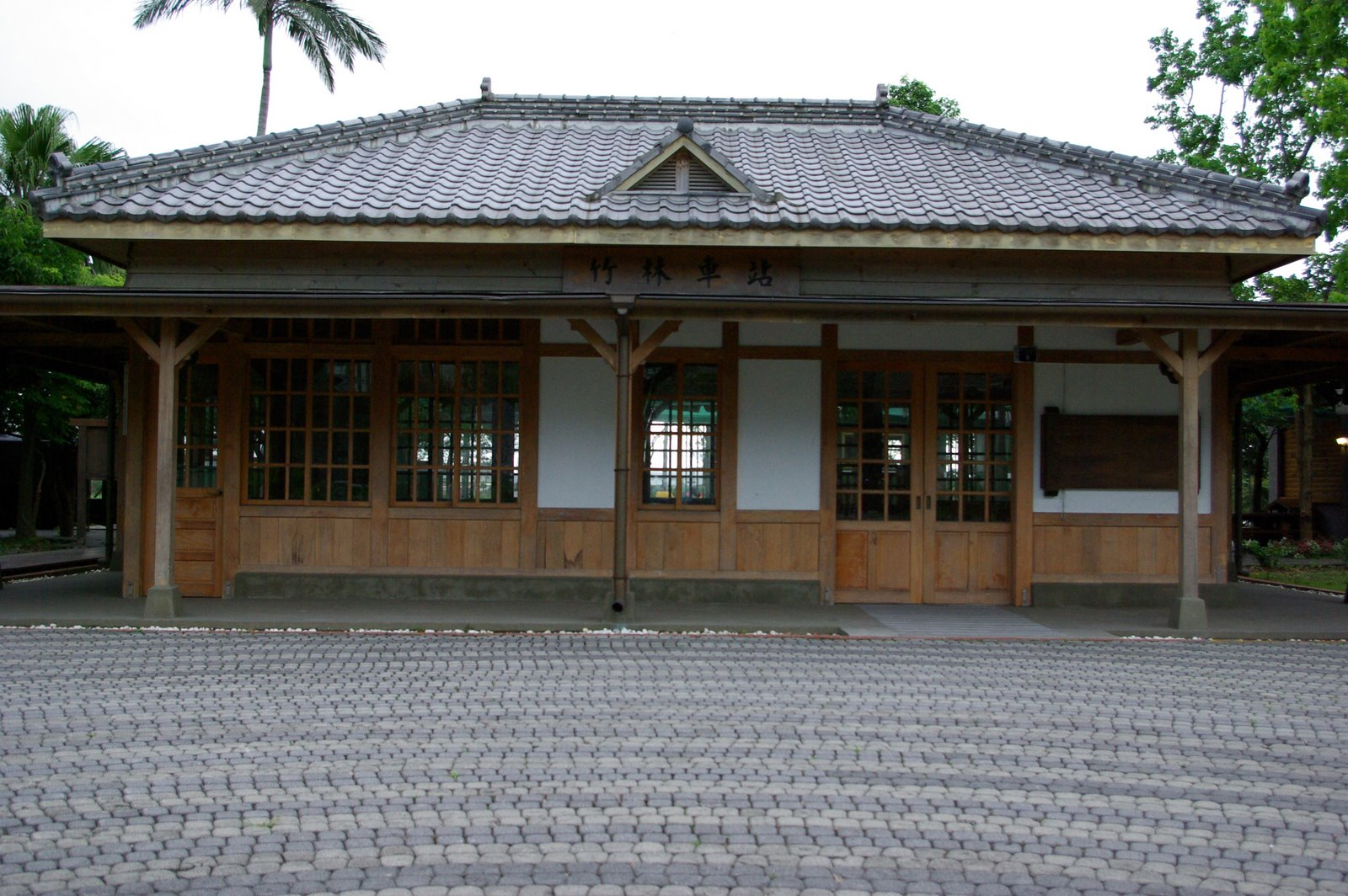
Chu-lin railway station

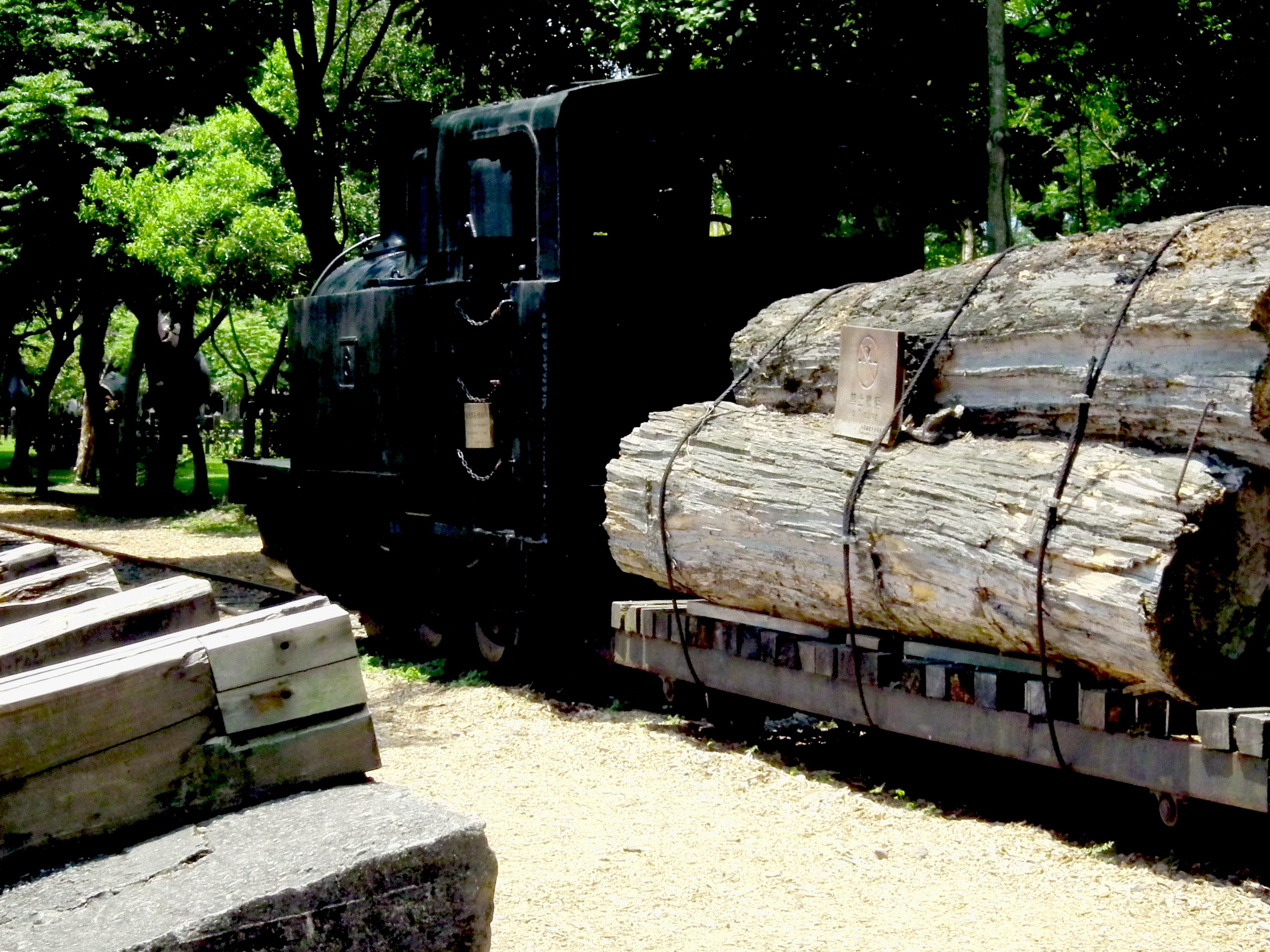
Luodong Forestry Culture Park

== Restoration ==
New railway tracks were laid on both sides of the road at Tien-sung-pi railway station. New rolling stock in the historic style was manufactured and successfully tested. A 3.9-km-long piece of track is planned to be used for regular heritage trains starting with effect of October 2017.
