= Taiping Mountain Forest Railway =

Forest railway in Yilan County, Taiwan

Coordinates: 24.49364°N 121.53645°E

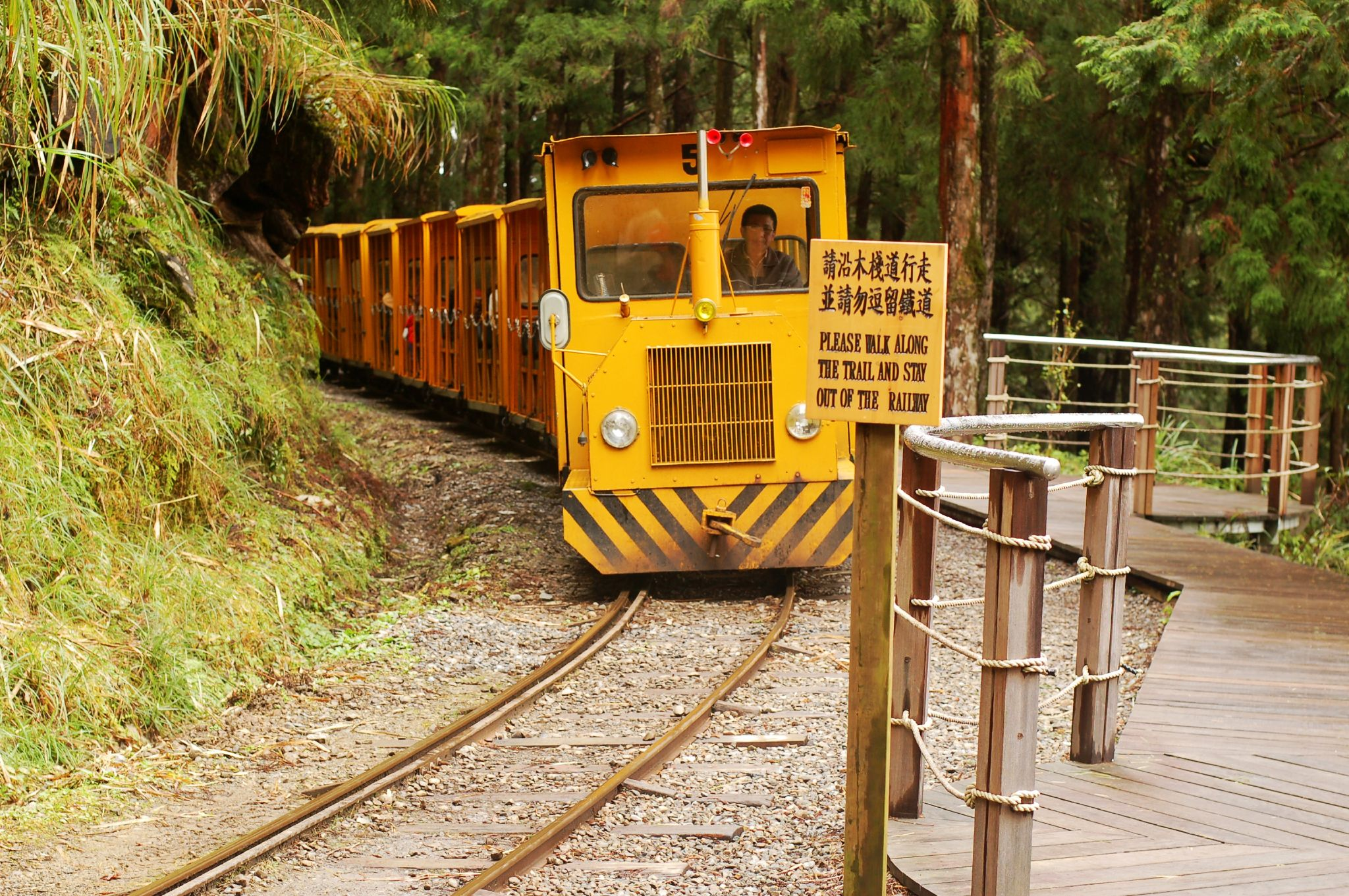
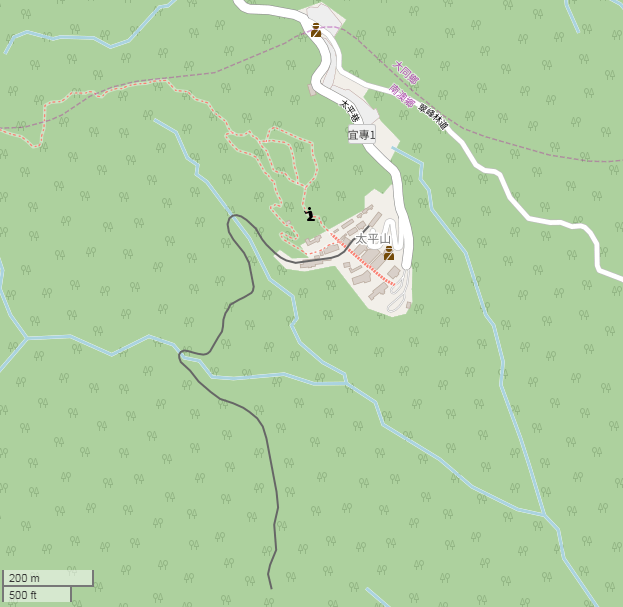
- Taipingshan Mountain Forest Railway

Technical
- Line length: 36.4 km (22.6 miles)
- Track gauge: 2 ft 6 in (762 mm)
- Minimum radius: 15 m
- Operating speed: 15 km/h max.
- Maximum incline: 3 %

Taiping Mountain Forest Railway

Taiping Mountain Forest Railway
- Chinese: 太平山森林鐵路
Transcriptions
Standard Mandarin
- Hanyu Pinyin: Tàipíng shān sēnlín tiělù
Southern Min
- Hokkien POJ: Thài-pîng-soaⁿ Sim-lîm Thih-lō͘

Bongbong Train
- Chinese: 蹦蹦車
Transcriptions
Standard Mandarin
- Hanyu Pinyin: Bèng bèng chē
Southern Min
- Hokkien POJ: Póng-póng-chhia

The Taiping Mountain Forest Railway (Chinese: 太平山森林鐵路), also known as Bongbong Train (蹦蹦車), is a 36.4 km (22.6 miles) long narrow-gauge forest railway with a gauge of 2 ft 6 in (762 mm) in Yilan County, Taiwan. Part of it can be used for heritage trains, but it is temporarily closed.

== History ==
The Taiping Mountain Forest Railway was commissioned in 1920 and connected to the Luodong Forest Railway in 1924. No regular passenger services have been provided since 1979, but a short section of the track was used for a sightseeing train. Since commercial forestry has been phased out on Taiping Mountain, the area is used for sightseeing and recreation.

In 2012, due to damage caused by a typhoon, the sightseeing train was taken out of use. On 19 September 2018, the operation was officially resumed on a 3 km-long section of the track. Eight trips per day are available between Tài Píng Shān-sho station and Shigeru station at intervals of 30 minutes. Each one-way trip takes 20 minutes.

== Maosing Reminiscent Trail ==
The 1.5 km (nearly 1 mile)-long Maosing Reminiscent Trail (茂興懷舊步道, closed) starts at the platform of Maosing Railway Station. It runs at a height of 1.870 m to 1.950 m above sea level on the disused railway track and has thus only a relatively small gradient. There are recreation and information boards about history, natural resources, and geology.

The Maosing Reminiscent Trail provides a combination of both heritage and ecotourism. Most of the railway sleepers are rotten, but a majority of the rails are still in good order; the rails are left in place and railway sleepers are covered in gravel to provide a footpath. Most of the trestle bridges have collapsed or deteriorated. Thus, some of them have been repaired, some of them left as historic ruins, and others have had to be removed and replaced by modern suspension bridges.

== Jancing Historic Trail ==
The Jancing Historic Trail (見晴懷古步道) was installed on a section of the former Jancing Forest Railway and originally had a total length of 2.35 km (1.4 miles). Since a landslide occurred, only 0.9 km (0.5 miles) are publicly accessible. The former Jancing Forest Railway was approximately 5.5 km (3.4 miles) long and provides access to the natural and cultural heritage along the old railway track. The remaining rails, trolleys, and bogies are a reminder of long-gone times of the lumber industry.

== Gallery ==
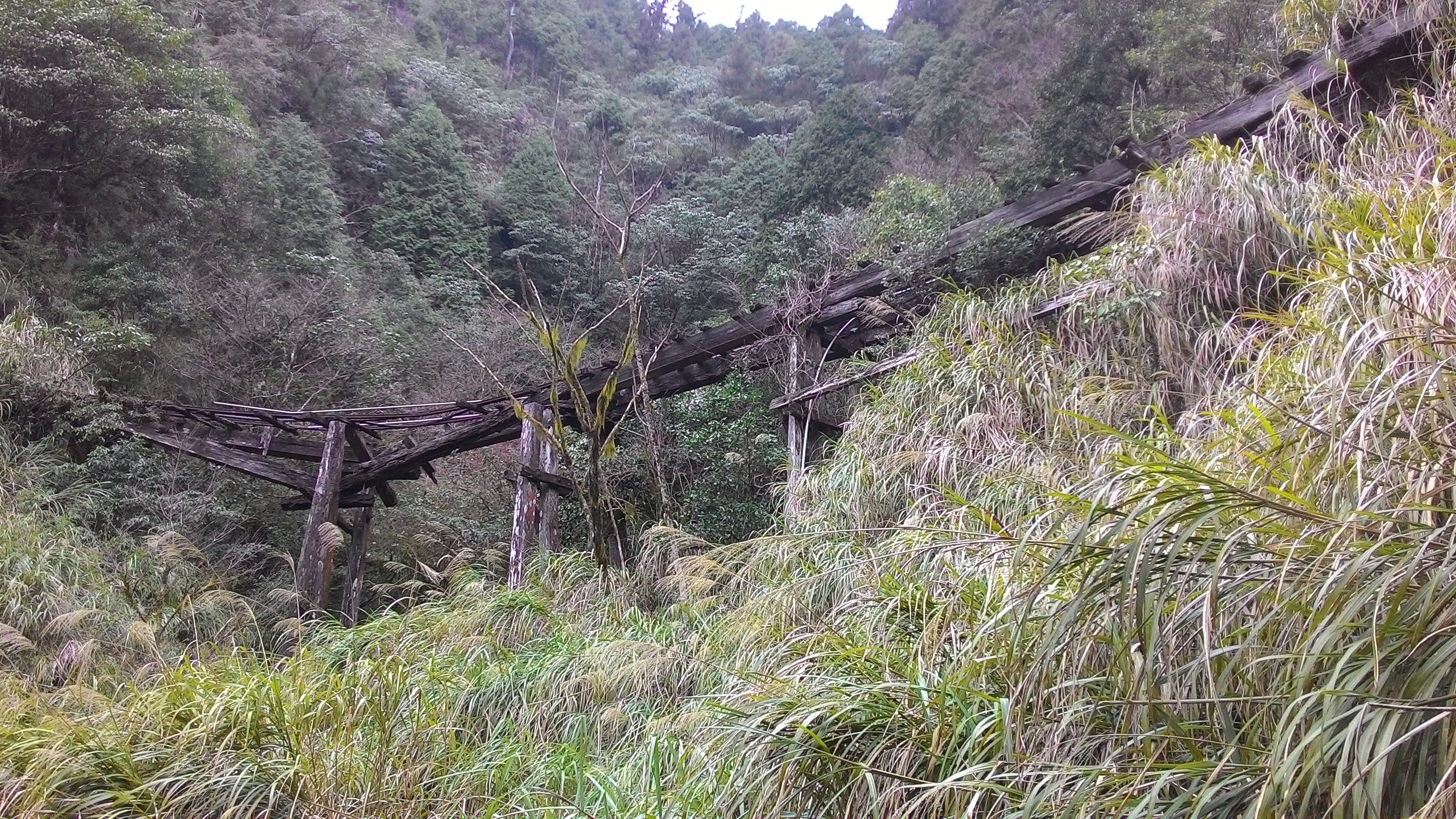
Remains of a wooden trestle bridge

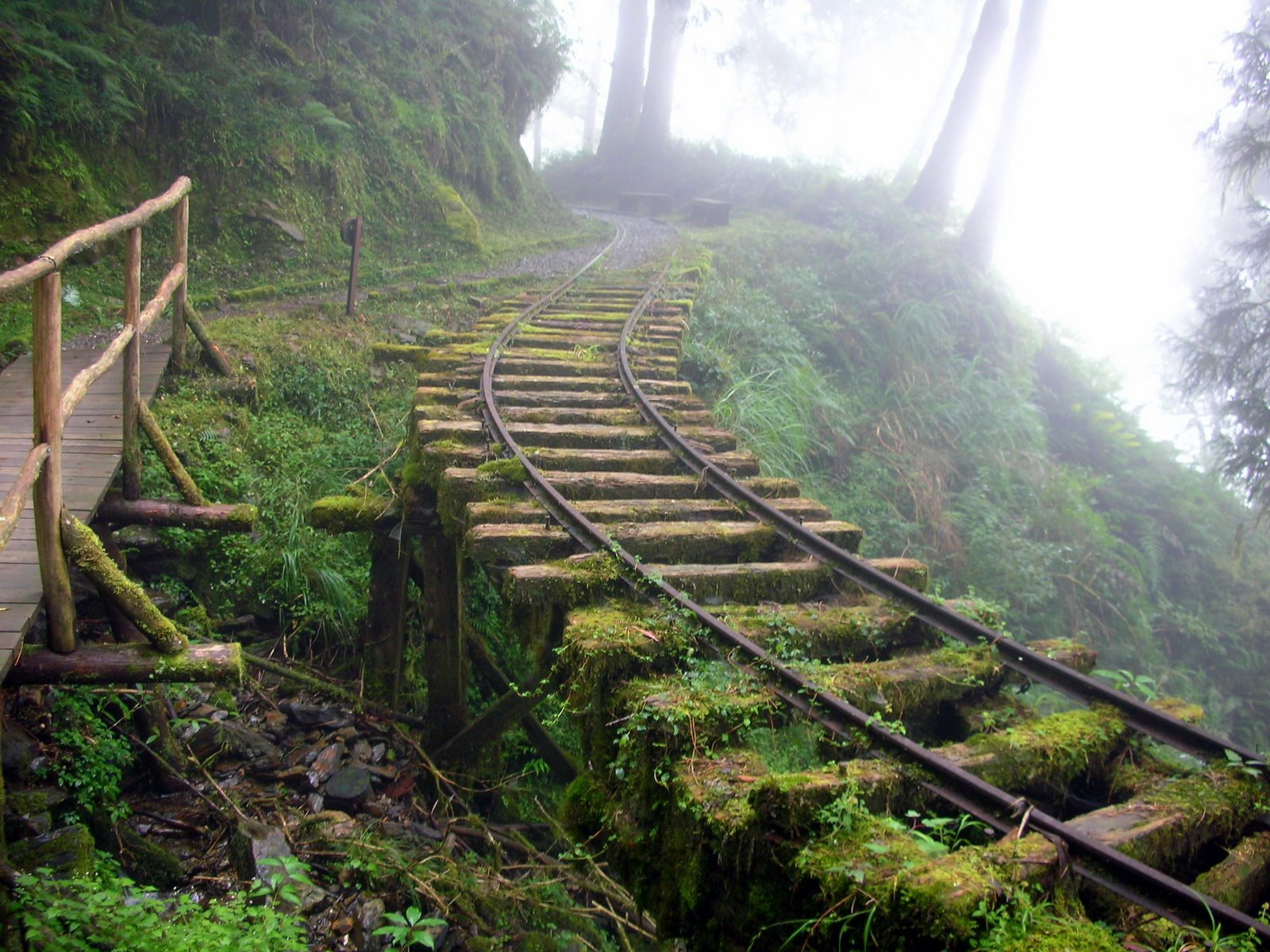
Maosing Reminiscent Trail

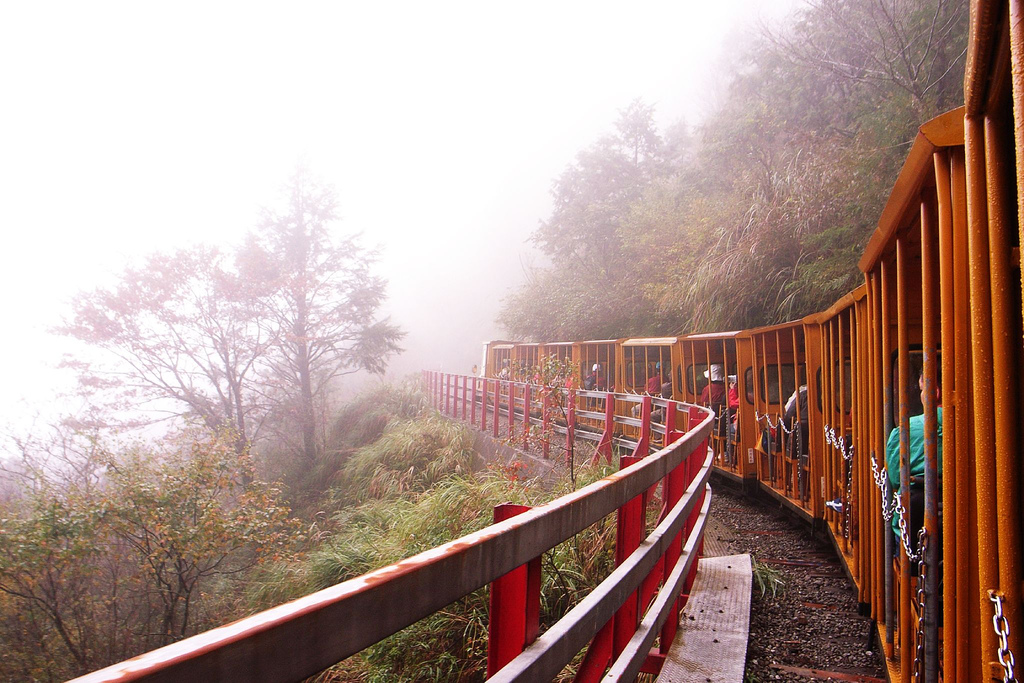
Taiping Mountain Bong Bong Train

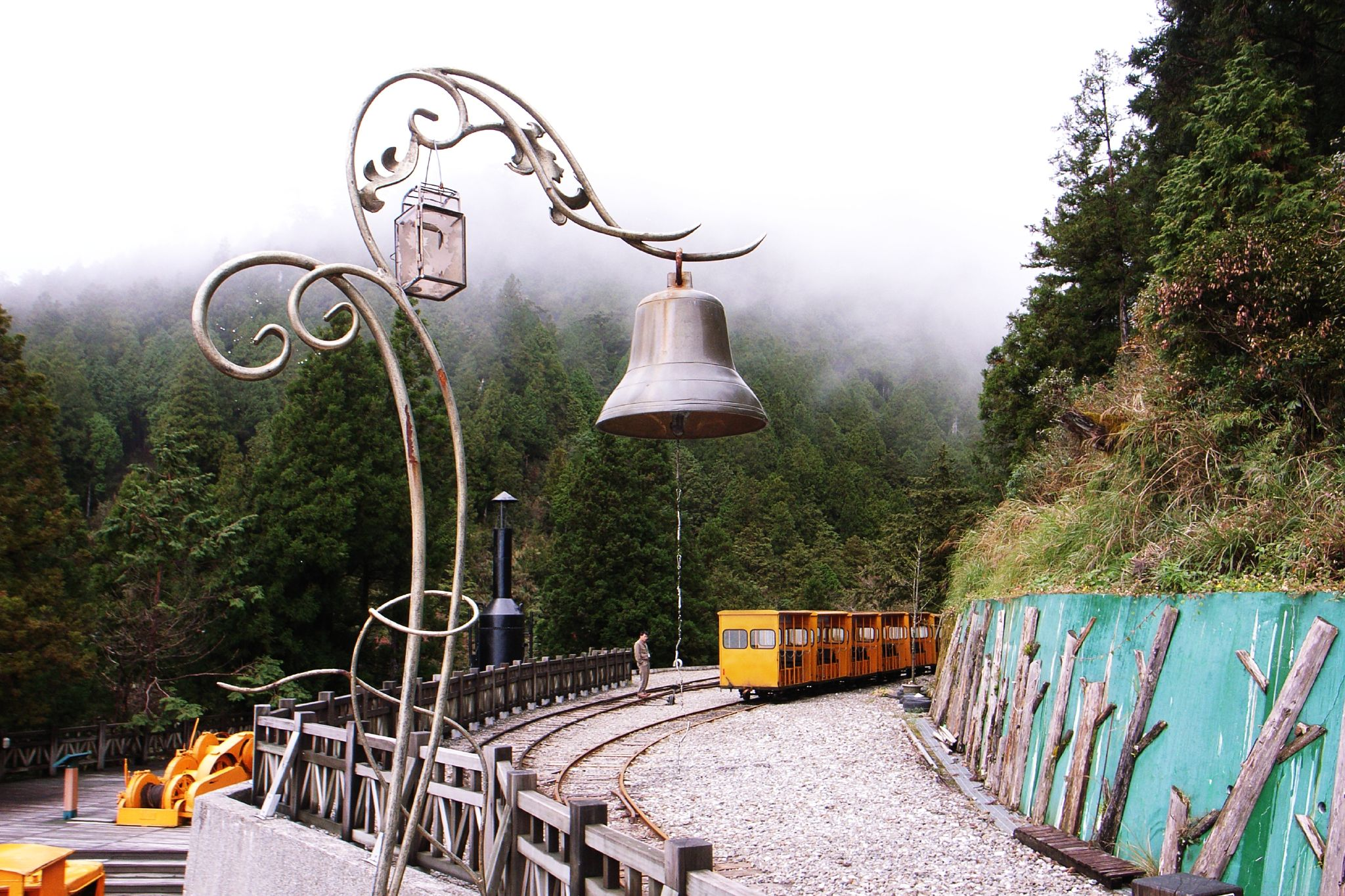
Taiping Mountain Bong Bong Train

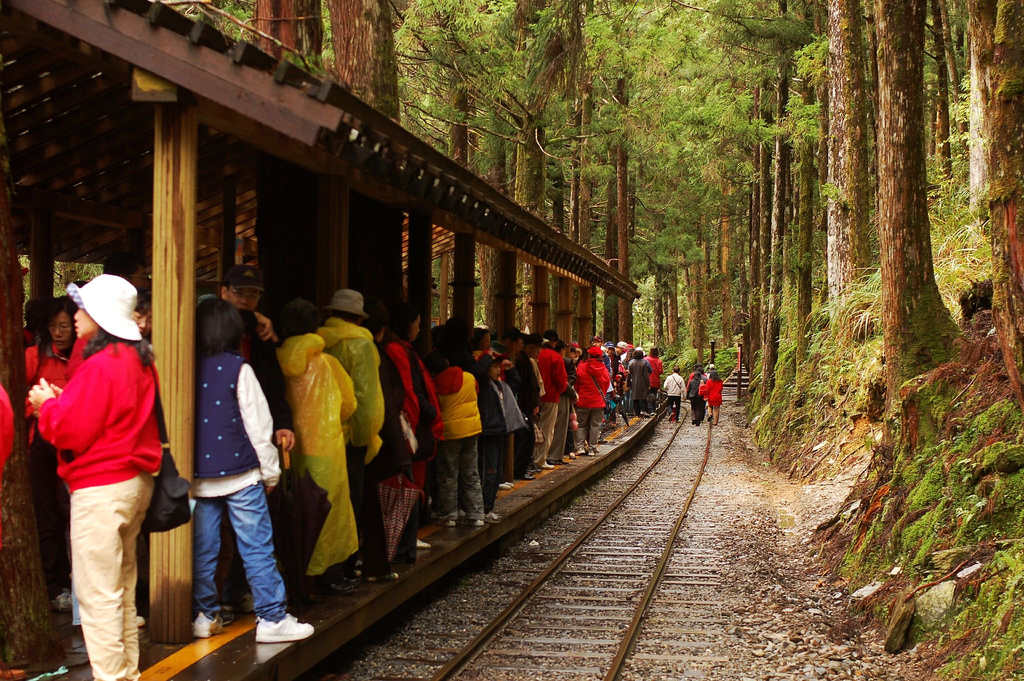
Taiping Mountain Bong Bong Train Station

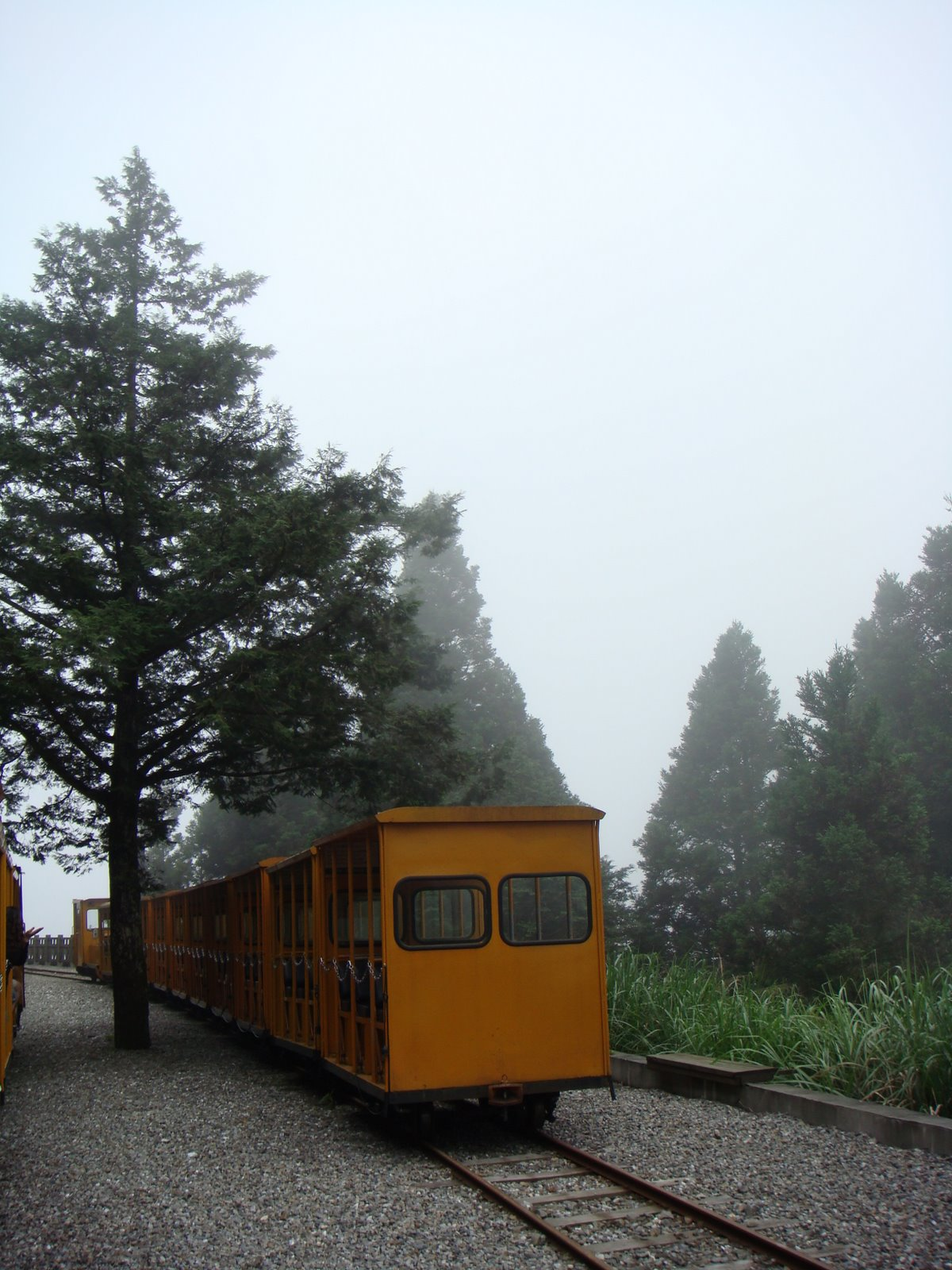
Taiping Mountain Bong Bong Train

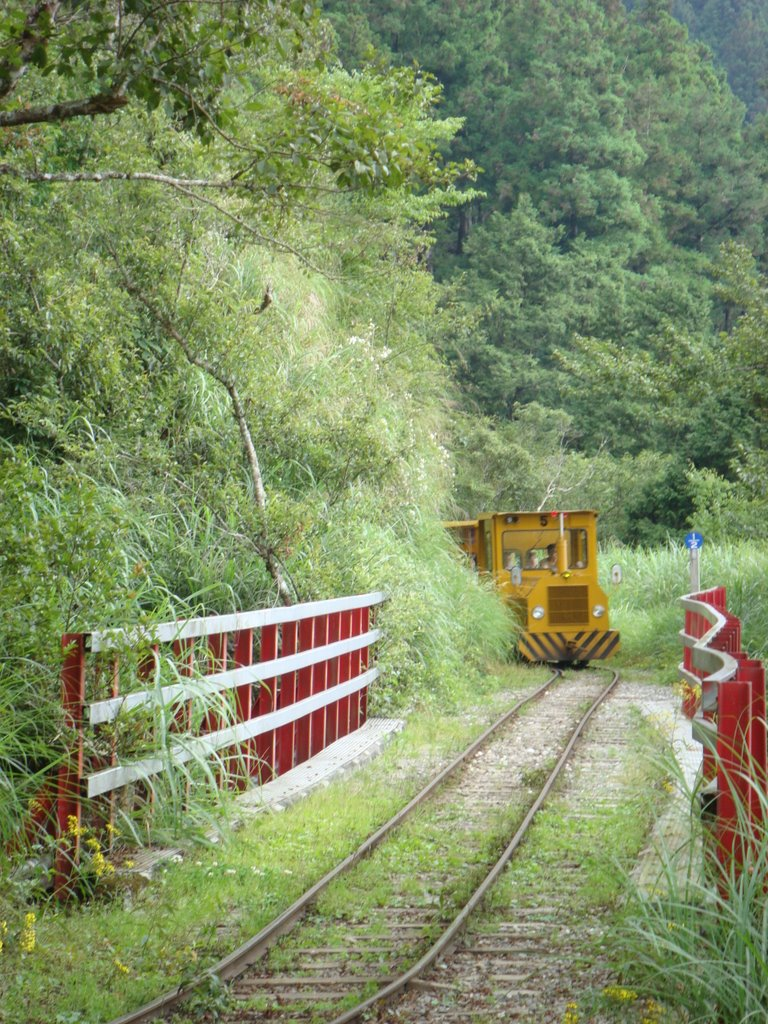
Taiping Mountain Bong Bong Train

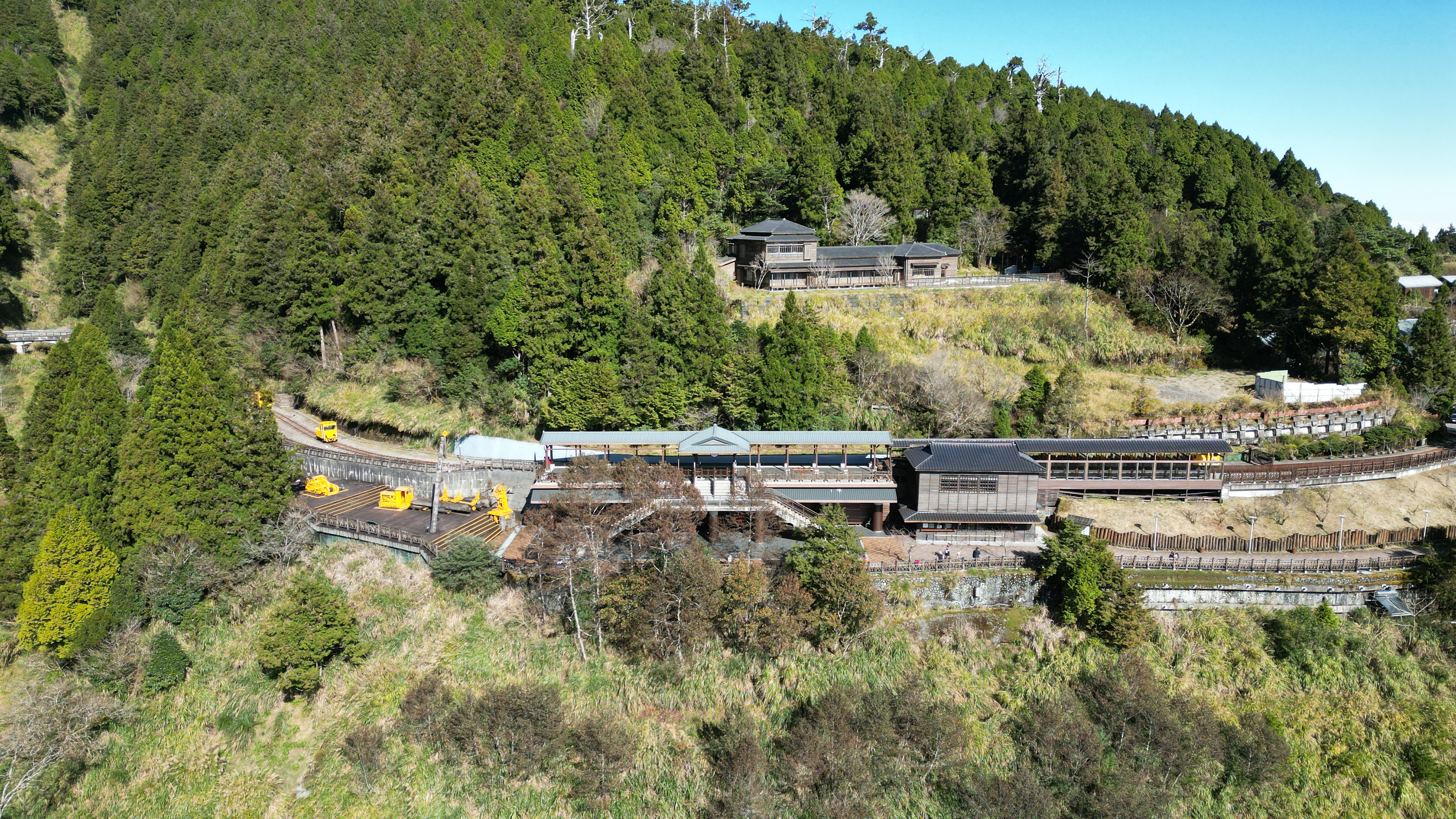
Taiping Mountain Forest Railway Station, 2022

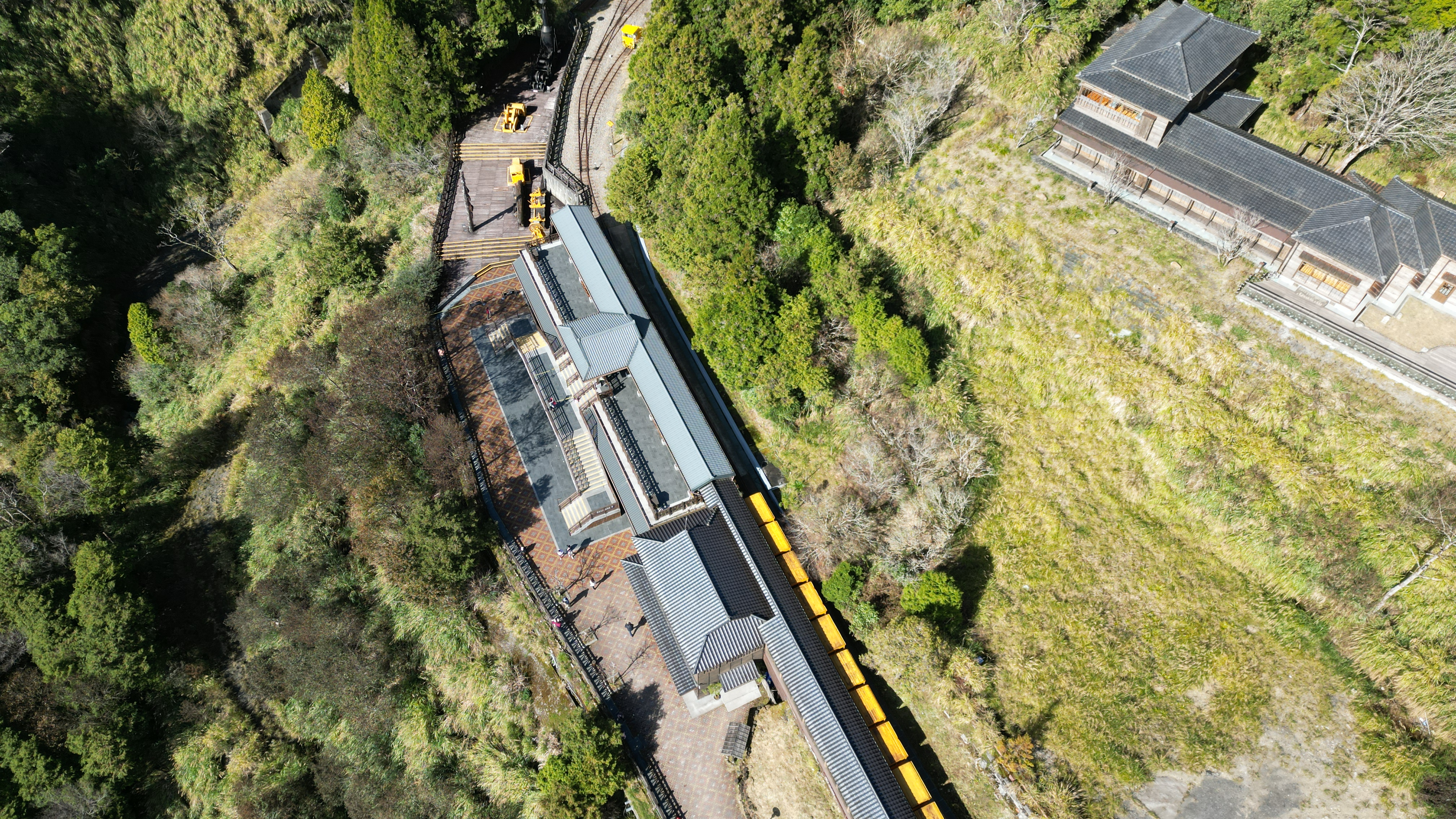
Top-down shot of Taiping Mountain Forest Railway Station, 2022

== Track ==
=== Old Taiping Mountain Railway ===
The Old Taiping Mountain Railway (Chinese: 舊太平山; pinyin: Jiù tàipíng shān; Pe̍h-ōe-jī: Kū Thài-pîng-soaⁿ) has been removed, and very little information about it is available.

=== New Taiping Mountain Railway ===
The New Taiping Mountain Railway (Chinese: 新太平山; pinyin: Xīn tàipíng shān; Pe̍h-ōe-jī: Sin Thài-pîng-soaⁿ) is the main system that exists today. It uses a combination of railways and aerial tramways to transport lumber down the mountainous terrain.

==== Stations ====
Type	Track	Station	Chinese	Taiwanese	Hakka	Transfers and notes
Railway	Jên-tsê Line	T'u-ch'ang	土場	Thô͘-tiûⁿ	Thú-chhòng	→ Luodong Forest Railway
Railway	Jên-tsê Line	Jên-tsê	仁澤	Jîn-te̍k	Yìn-chet	
Aerial tramway	Jên-tsê Tramway	Jên-tsê	仁澤	Jîn-te̍k	Yìn-chet	
Aerial tramway	Jên-tsê Tramway	Middle	中間	Tiong-kan	Chûng-kiên	
Railway	Lan-t'ai Line	Middle	中間	Tiong-kan	Chûng-kiên	
Railway	Lan-t'ai Line	Lan-t'ai	蘭臺	Lân-tâi	Làn-thòi	
Aerial tramway	Pai-ling Tramway	Lan-t'ai	蘭臺	Lân-tâi	Làn-thòi	
Aerial tramway	Pai-ling Tramway	Pai-ling	白嶺	Pe̍h-niá	Pha̍k-liâng	
Railway	Pai-mi Line	Pai-ling	白嶺	Pe̍h-niá	Pha̍k-liâng	
Railway	Pai-mi Line	Pai-mi	白糸	Pe̍h-mi	Pha̍k-mì	
Aerial tramway	Pai-mi Tramway	Pai-mi	白糸	Pe̍h-mi	Pha̍k-mì	
Aerial tramway	Pai-mi Tramway	Shang-p'ing	上平	Siōng-pîng	Sông-phìn	
Railway	T'ai-p'ing Mt Line	Shang-p'ing	上平	Siōng-pîng	Sông-phìn	
Railway	T'ai-p'ing Mt Line	T'ai-p'ing Mt	太平山	Thài-pîng-soaⁿ	Thai-phìn-sân	
Railway	T'ai-p'ing Mt Line	T'ai-p'ing Mt; Junction	太平山分歧點	Thài-pîng-soaⁿ; Hun-kî-tiám	Thai-phìn-sân; Fûn-khîa-tiám	Junction of San-hsing, Mao-hsing, and Chien-ch'ing Lines
Railway	Chien-ch'ing Line	Rail End	路尾	Lō͘-bóe	Lu-mî	Border of Taiping Mt and Dayuan Mt Work Stations
Railway	Mao-hsing Line	Mao-hsing	茂興	Bō͘-heng	Meu-hîn	Limited tourist service around station

==== Lines ====
Name of the track	From station to station	Distance	Max. incline	Min. radius	Bridges (total length)	Tunnels (total length)	Number of trains
Renze (仁澤線)	Tuchang (土場) - Renze (仁澤)	4,53 km	3%	15 m	63 (1665 m)	2 (62 m)	3
Lantai (蘭臺線)	Middle Station (中間) - Lantai (蘭臺)	3,92 km	2%	15 m	62 (1635 m)	1 (47 m)	3
Baimi (白糸線)	Bailing (白嶺) - Baimi (白糸)	3,20 km	2,5%	15 m	16 (480 m)	0 (0 m)	3
Taipingshan (太平山線)	Shangping (上平) - Taipingshan (太平山)	1,60 km	2,5%	15 m	16 (480 m)	0 (0 m)	4
Sanxing (三星線)	Taiping Mountain Junction (太平山分歧點) - Terminus	15,3 km	2,5%	15 m	16 (480 m)	0 (0 m)	4
Maoxing (Maosing) (茂興線)	Taiping Mountain Junction - Terminus	20,9 km	2,5%		42	0 (0 m)	3
Jianqing (Jiancing) (見晴線)	Taiping Mountain Junction - Endstation	5,60 km	2%	15 m	62 (1635 m)	0 (0 m)	

=== Dayuan Mountain Railway ===
Dayuan Mountain (Chinese: 大元山; pinyin: Dà yuán shān; Pe̍h-ōe-jī: Tāi-goân-soaⁿ)

Name of the track	From station to station	Distance	Max. incline	Min. radius	Bridges (total length)	Tunnels (total length)	Number of trains
Dayuanshan (大元山線) / Si gongli (四公里線)	Anbu aerial tram (鞍部索道), Dayuan aerial tram (大元索道) - Cuifeng aerial tram (翠峰索道)	7,86 km	6,3%	20 m	88 (570 m)	1	
Cuifeng (翠峰線)	Cuifeng aerial tram (翠峰索道) - Wangyang mountain side (望洋山腰)	9,0 km	2,5%		97 (570 m)	0	
Qingfeng (晴峰線)	Qingfeng aerial tram (晴峰索道) - Zhongxinggang (中興崗)	5,1 km	2,0%		25	0	
Piya (埤ㄚ線)	Start of Piya aerial tram (埤ㄚ索道著點)						
