= Changpi Lake =

Lake in Sanxing, Yilan County, Taiwan

- 長埤湖 (Chinese)
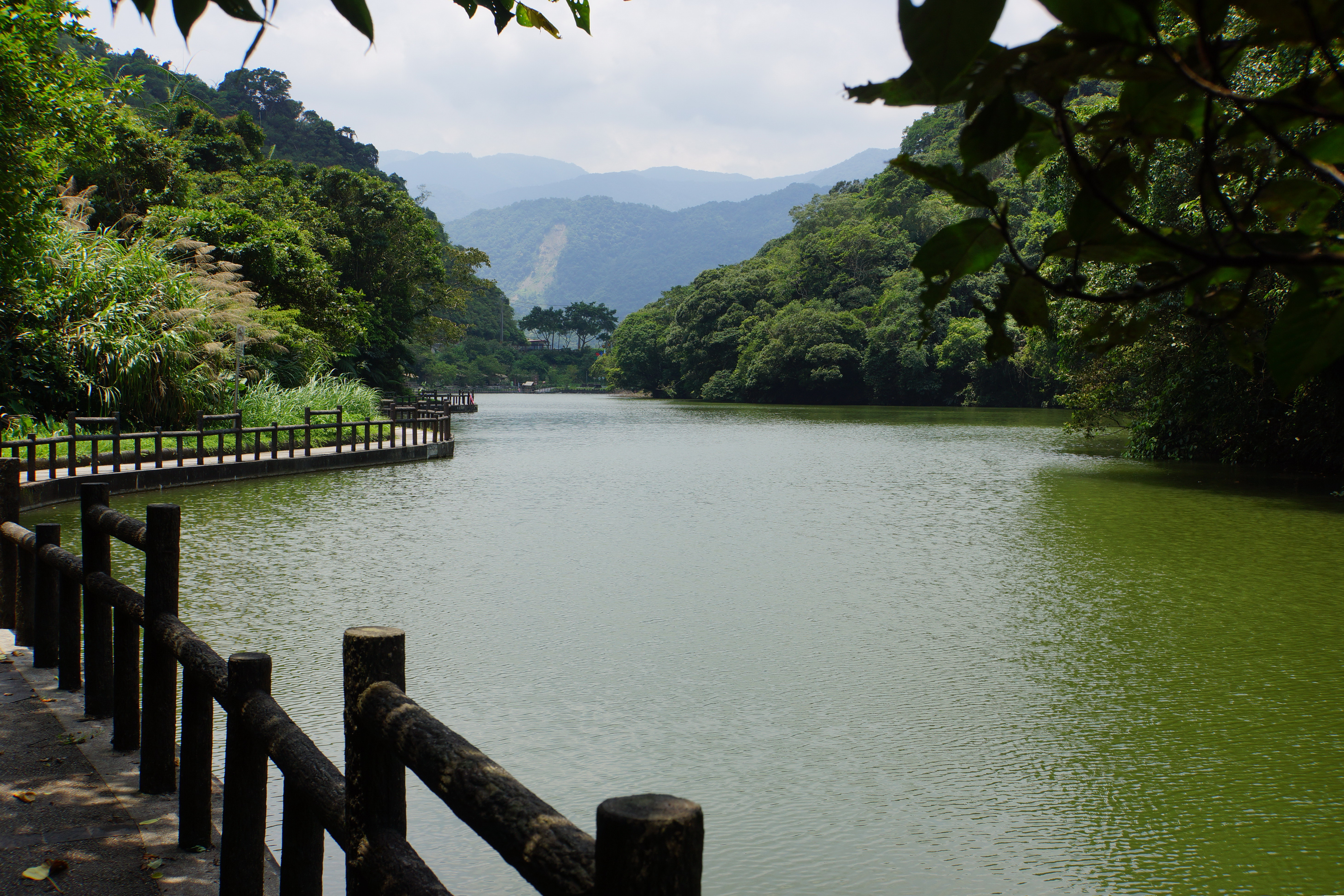

- Taiwan
- Location: Sanxing, Yilan County, Taiwan
- Coordinates: 24°38′42.2″N 121°36′43.7″E
- Type: lake
- Surface elevation: 190 meters (620 ft)

The Changpi Lake (traditional Chinese: 長埤湖; simplified Chinese: 长埤湖; pinyin: Zhǎngpí Hú) is a lake in Sanxing Township, Yilan County, Taiwan.

== History ==
The lake used to be cavalry stable area for the Imperial Japanese Army during the Japanese rule of Taiwan.

== Geography ==
Changpi Lake is located at an altitude of about 190 meters. The major land forms around the land include the subtropical forest that surrounds it. The lake has water all year round but it changes levels according to the seasons. The lake area is equipped with various recreational facilities such as camping area, barbecue area, playground, trails etc.

== See also ==
- Geography of Taiwan
