= Luodong Forestry Culture Park =

Park in Luodong, Yilan County, Taiwan

- 羅東林業文化園區
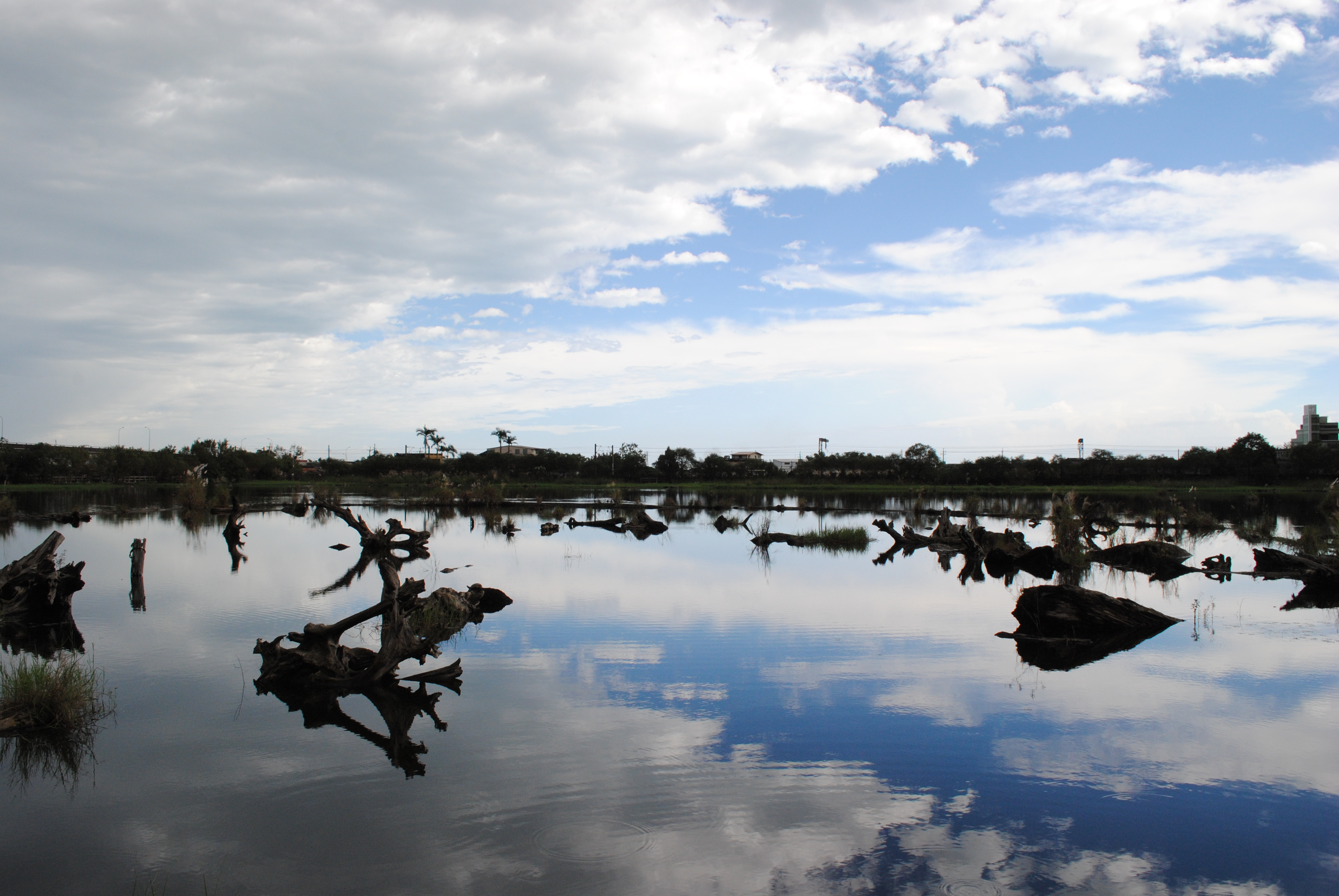
- Interactive map of Luodong Forestry Culture Park
- Type: park
- Location: Luodong, Yilan County, Taiwan
- Coordinates: 24°41′1.8″N 121°46′24.7″E
- Opening: 2009
- Public transit: Luodong Station
- Website: https://www.forest.gov.tw/EN/0000222

The Luodong Forestry Culture Park (simplified Chinese: 罗东林业文化园区; traditional Chinese: 羅東林業文化園區; pinyin: Luódōng Línyè Wénhuà Yuánqū) is a park in Luodong Township, Yilan County, Taiwan.

== History ==
In 1905, the original site of the park became a major timber production area of the Luodong Branch of the Taiping Forest Area, managed by the Forestry Agency of the Empire of Japan. The logs were transported out of Yilan via the Lanyang River. In 1921, the agency purchased the Taiwan Sugar Railway from the Taiwan Sugar Factory and used it as the Luodong Forest Railway to transport timber.

In 1982, the government adjusted its policies on the forestry industry and production from the area started to decline. In 1994–2001, the Third Luodong Township Urban Planning Review designated the area as a special forestry industry culture site. In 2004, the Forestry Bureau unveiled a plan to turn the area into a culture park. Also in the same year, the Council for Cultural Affairs listed all of the remaining artifacts and buildings in the area as historical assets. The area was subsequently developed into the Luodong Forestry Culture Park in 2009 and listed as a cultural landscape area in 2012.

== Geography ==
The park spans over an area of 16 hectares. It consists of several timber ponds.

== Architecture ==
The culture park is divided into several areas:

- art district
- artifact exhibition hall
- bamboo railway station
- primitive habitat
- storage pool

== Transportation ==
The park is accessible within walking distance north of Luodong Station of Taiwan Railway.

== See also ==
- List of tourist attractions in Taiwan
