= Sanxing, Yilan =

Rural township in Yilan County, Taiwan

Coordinates: 24°40′26″N 121°39′47″E

Sanxing Township 三星鄉 Sansei
- Rural township
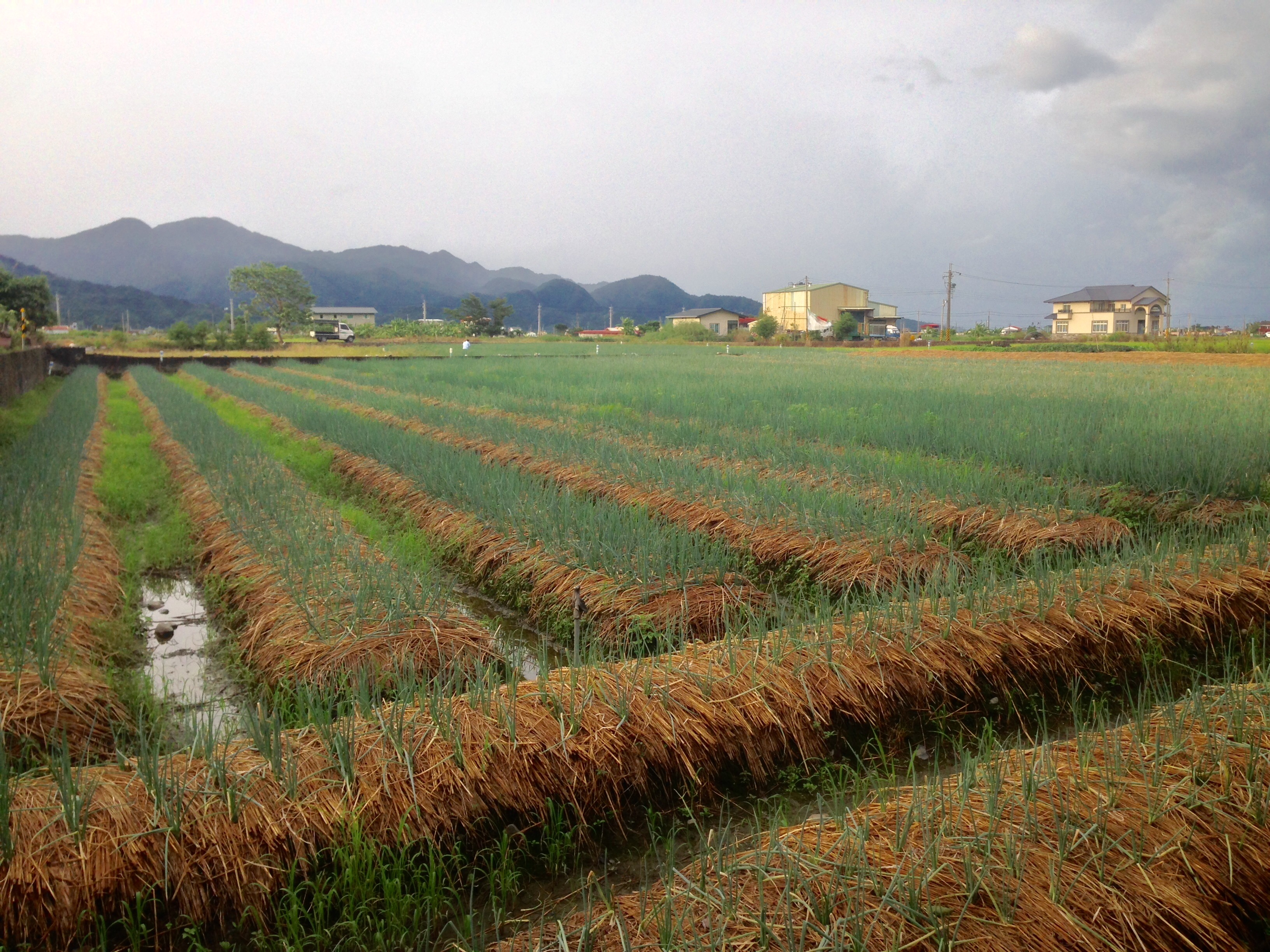
- Fields of spring onion in Sanxing Township

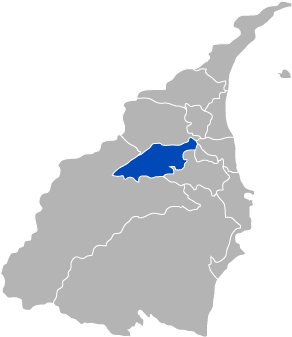
- Sanxing Township in Yilan County
- Location: Yilan County, Taiwan

Area
  - Total: 144.22 km^{2} (55.68 sq mi)

Population (September 2023)
  - Total: 21,239
  - Density: 147.27/km^{2} (381.42/sq mi)
- Website: www.sanshing.gov.tw (in Chinese)

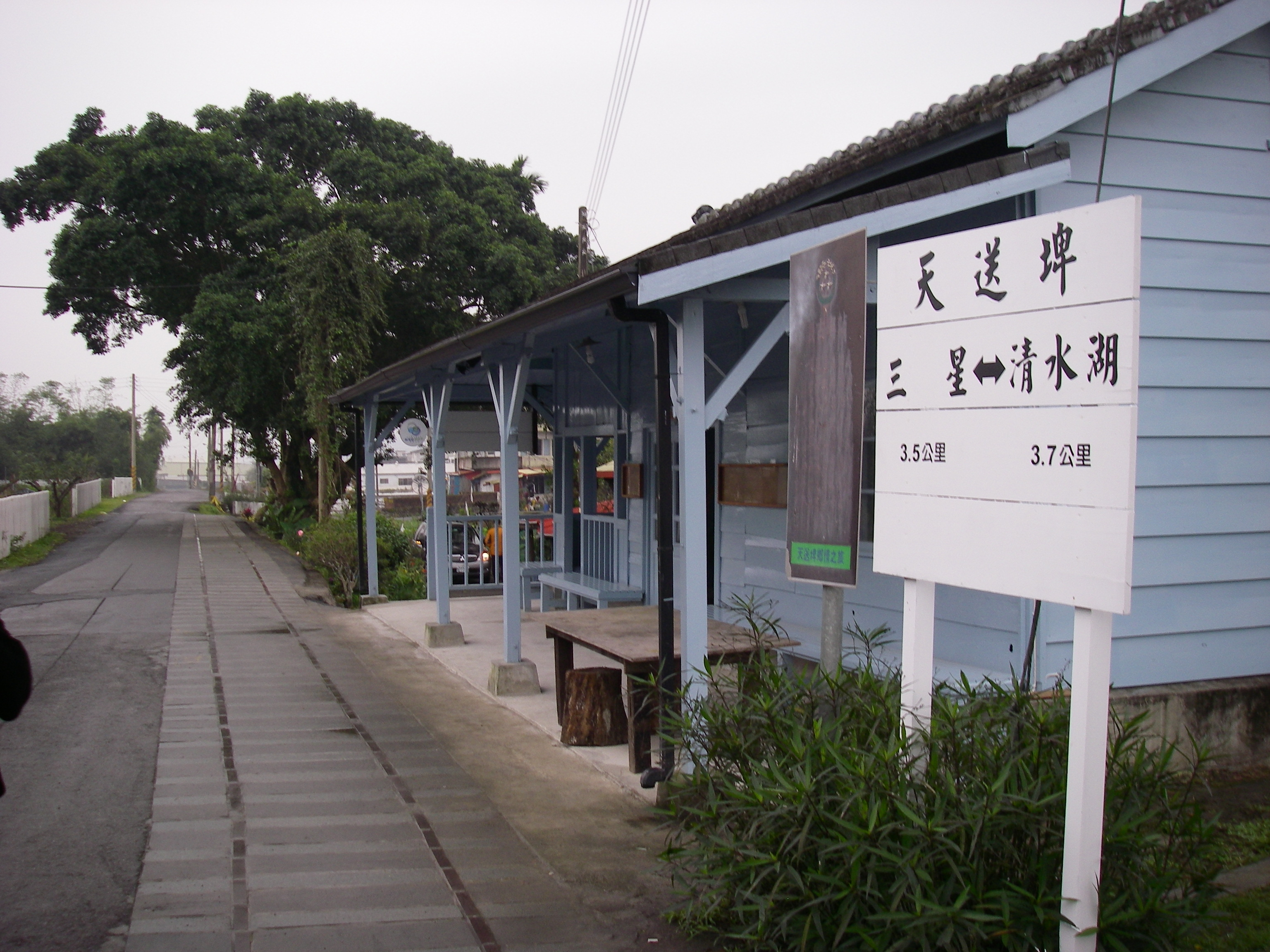
The restored station of the decommissioned Luodong Forest Railway in Sanxing Township

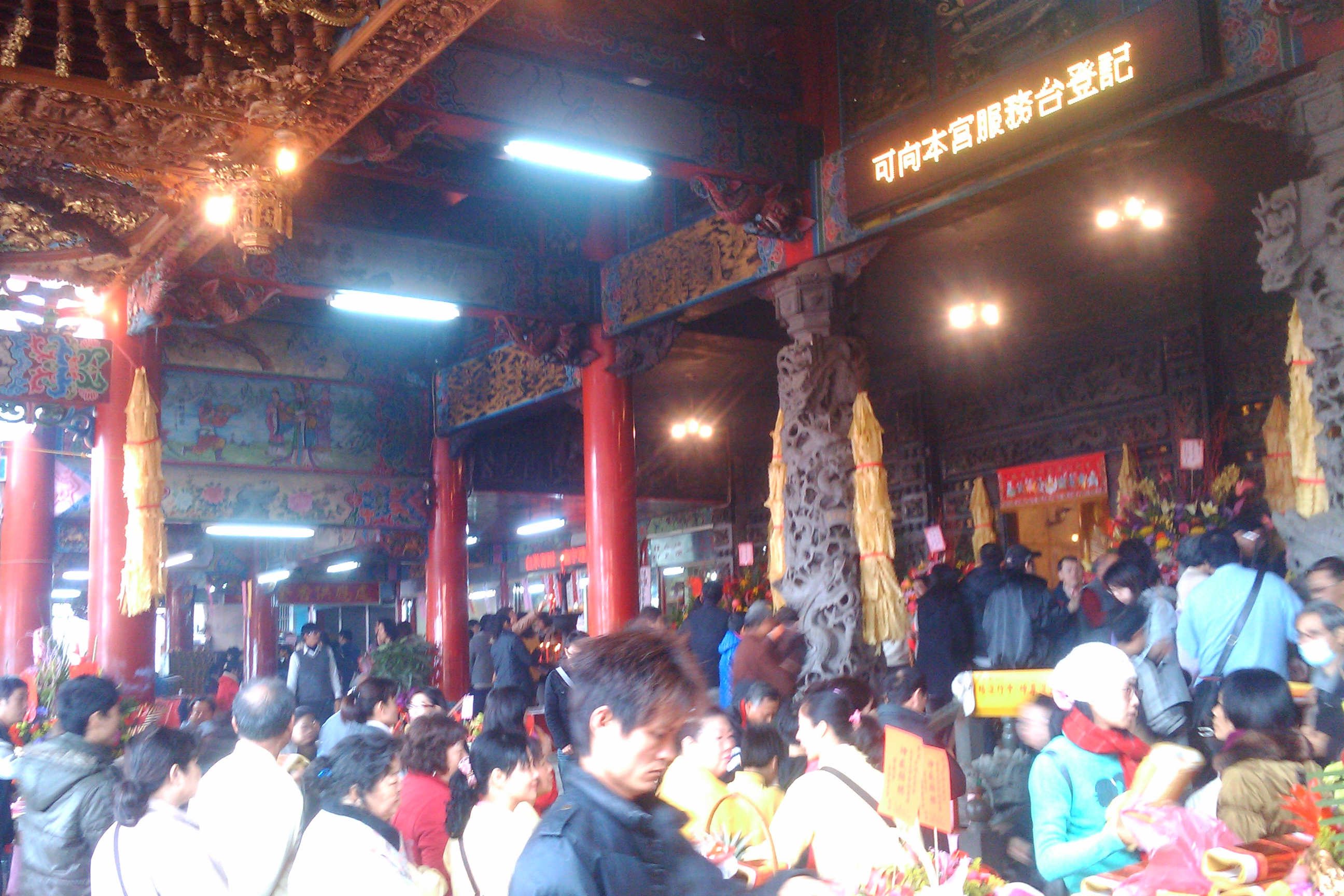
Yuzun Temple

Sanxing Township (Chinese: 三星鄉; Hanyu Pinyin: Sānxīng Xiāng; Tongyong Pinyin: Sansing Siang; Wade–Giles: San^{1}-hsing^{1} Hsiang^{1}), also spelled Sanshing Township, is a rural township in the western part of Yilan County, Taiwan.

== Geography ==
It has an area of 144.22 km^{2} and estimate population of 21,239 people as of September 2023.

== Administrative divisions ==
The township comprises 18 villages: Dayi, Dayin, Dazhou, Gongzhao, Guilin, Hangjian, Jiqing, Renhe, Shangwu, Shuangxian, Tianfu, Tianshan, Wande, Wanfu, Weiqian, Yide, Yuanshan and Yuemei.

== Education ==
- St. Mary's Medicine Nursing and Management College

== Tourist attractions ==
- Changpi Lake
- Spring Onion Culture Museum
- Sanxing Ganquan Temple
- Yuzun Temple

== Transportation ==
- Highway 7
- County Road 196

== Notable natives ==
- Chen Chu, Mayor of Kaohsiung City (2006–2018)
- John Deng, Minister of Economic Affairs (2014-2016)
