= Luodong railway station =

Railway station in Taiwan

Luodong 羅東
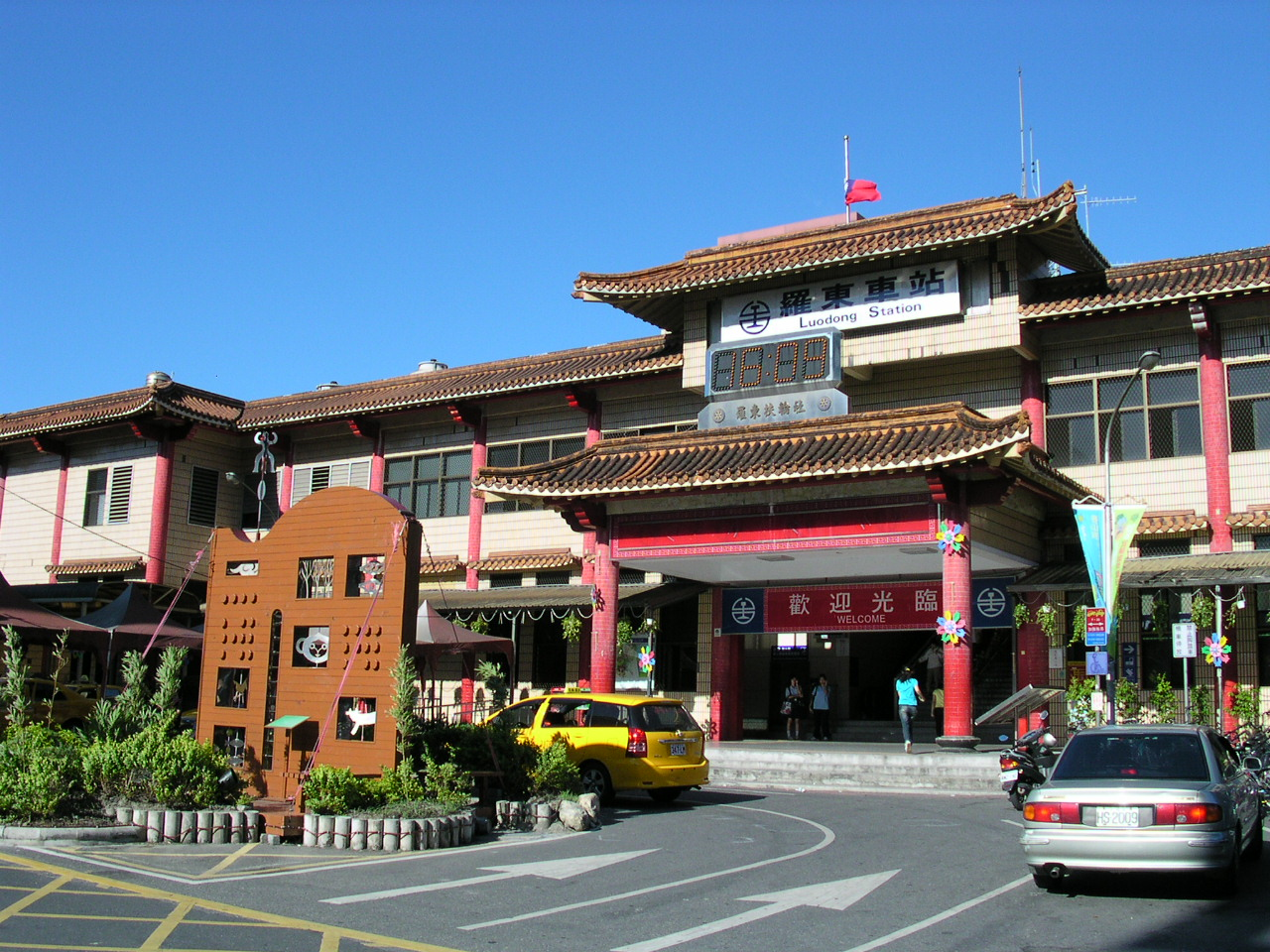

Chinese name
- Traditional Chinese: 羅東
Transcriptions
Standard Mandarin
- Hanyu Pinyin: Luódōng
- Bopomofo: ㄌㄨㄛˊ ㄉㄨㄥ

General information
- Location: 2 Gongzheng Rd; Luodong, Yilan County; Taiwan
- Coordinates: 24.6779°N 121.7747°E
- System: Taiwan Railway railway station
- Line: Eastern Trunk line
- Distance: 80.1 km to Badu
- Connections: Local bus; Coach

Construction
- Structure type: Ground level

Other information
- Station code: E22 (statistical)
- Classification: Second class (Chinese: 二等)
- Website: www.railway.gov.tw/luodong/ (in Chinese)

History
- Opened: 1913-03-24
- Rebuilt: 2003-08
- Electrified: 2000-05-03

Passengers
- 2017: 4.501 million per year ▼0.62%
- Rank: 28 out of 228

Services
Preceding station	Taiwan Railway	Following station
Zhongli towards Badu	Eastern Trunk line	Dongshan towards Taitung
Location
- Location within Taiwan

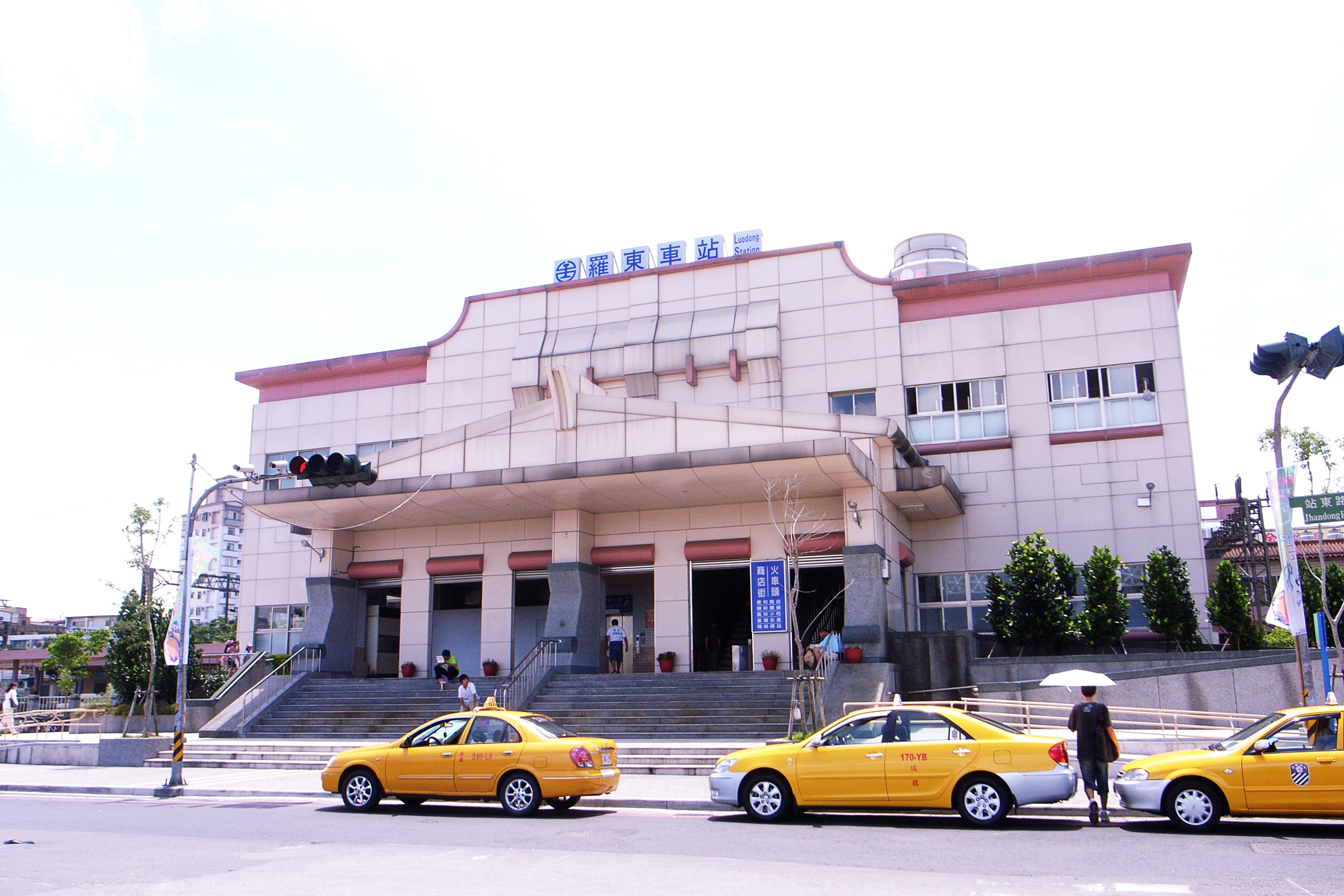
Luodong Station rear

Luodong (Chinese: 羅東; pinyin: Luódōng) is a railway station in Luodong Township, Yilan County, Taiwan served by Taiwan Railway.

== Overview ==
The station has one island platform and one side platform. The station building is located above the platforms and is accessible from both the station front and rear. It is a major station on the Yilan line, and is a second-tier station. Many express trains, including the Taroko Express, stop at this station.

== History ==
- 24 March 1919: The station opened for service.
- 24 October 1985: The current palace-style station opened for service.

== Around the station ==
- Dongshan River Water Park
- Luodong Bo-ai Hospital
- Luodong Forestry Culture Park
- Luodong Sports Park
- Luodong Night Market
- Luodong Township center
- Zhongshan Park
- Luodong Exercise Park
- Forestry Bureau, Luodong Area Branch
- Shengmu Hospital

== See also ==
- List of railway stations in Taiwan
