= Luodong Sports Park =

Park in Luodong, Yilan County, Taiwan

- 羅東運動公園
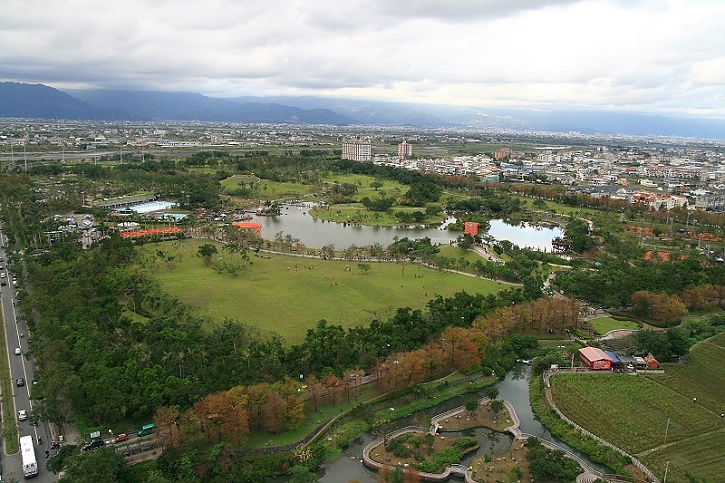
- Interactive map of Luodong Sports Park
- Type: Park
- Location: Luodong, Yilan County, Taiwan
- Coordinates: 24°41′01.8″N 121°45′08.5″E
- Area: 47 hectares (120 acres)
- Public transit: Luodong Station

Luodong Sports Park (Chinese: 羅東運動公園; pinyin: Luódōng Yùndòng Gōngyuán) is a park in Luodong Township, Yilan County, Taiwan.

== Architecture ==
The park covers 47 hectares of land and it includes a range of facilities for sport including basketball, and a swimming pool. The park is divided into four sections that include: forest area, sport area, waterscapes, and other landscapes.

== Transportation ==
The park is accessible from Luodong Station of Taiwan Railway by heading west along Gongzheng Road for 2.2 kilometers.

== See also ==
- List of parks in Taiwan
