= Lotung Poh-Ai Hospital =

Hospital in Luodong, Yilan County, Taiwan

Coordinates: 24.6712°N 121.7725°E

Lotung Poh-Ai Hospital 羅東博愛醫院

Geography
- Location: Luodong, Yilan County, Taiwan

Organisation
- Type: Hospital

Services
- Beds: 1,000

History
- Founded: 1953

Links
- Website: www.pohai.org.tw/en/pohai_web_en.htm

Lo-Hsu Medical Foundation Lotung Poh-Ai Hospital (traditional Chinese: 醫療財團法人羅許基金會羅東博愛醫院; simplified Chinese: 医疗财团法人罗许基金会罗东博爱医院; pinyin: Yīliáo Cáituán Fǎrén Luóxǔ Jījīnhuì Luódōng Bó'ài Yīyuàn), commonly known as Lotung Poh-Ai Hospital (traditional Chinese: 羅東博愛醫院; simplified Chinese: 罗东博爱医院; pinyin: Luódōng Bó'ài Yīyuàn) is a hospital in Luodong Township, Yilan County, Taiwan. It is one of three teaching hospitals in this region, and the largest, with over 1,000 beds, and 1,400 staff.

== History ==
The hospital was established in 1953 with 30 beds in a small-scale hospital building.

== Specialties ==
- Internal Medicine Group
- Surgical Specialties Group
- Other Specialties Group

== See also ==
- Healthcare in Taiwan
- List of hospitals in Taiwan
