= Luodong =

Urban township in Yilan County, Taiwan

Coordinates: 24°40′31″N 121°46′16″E

Luodong Township 羅東鎮 Ratō, Lotung
- Urban township
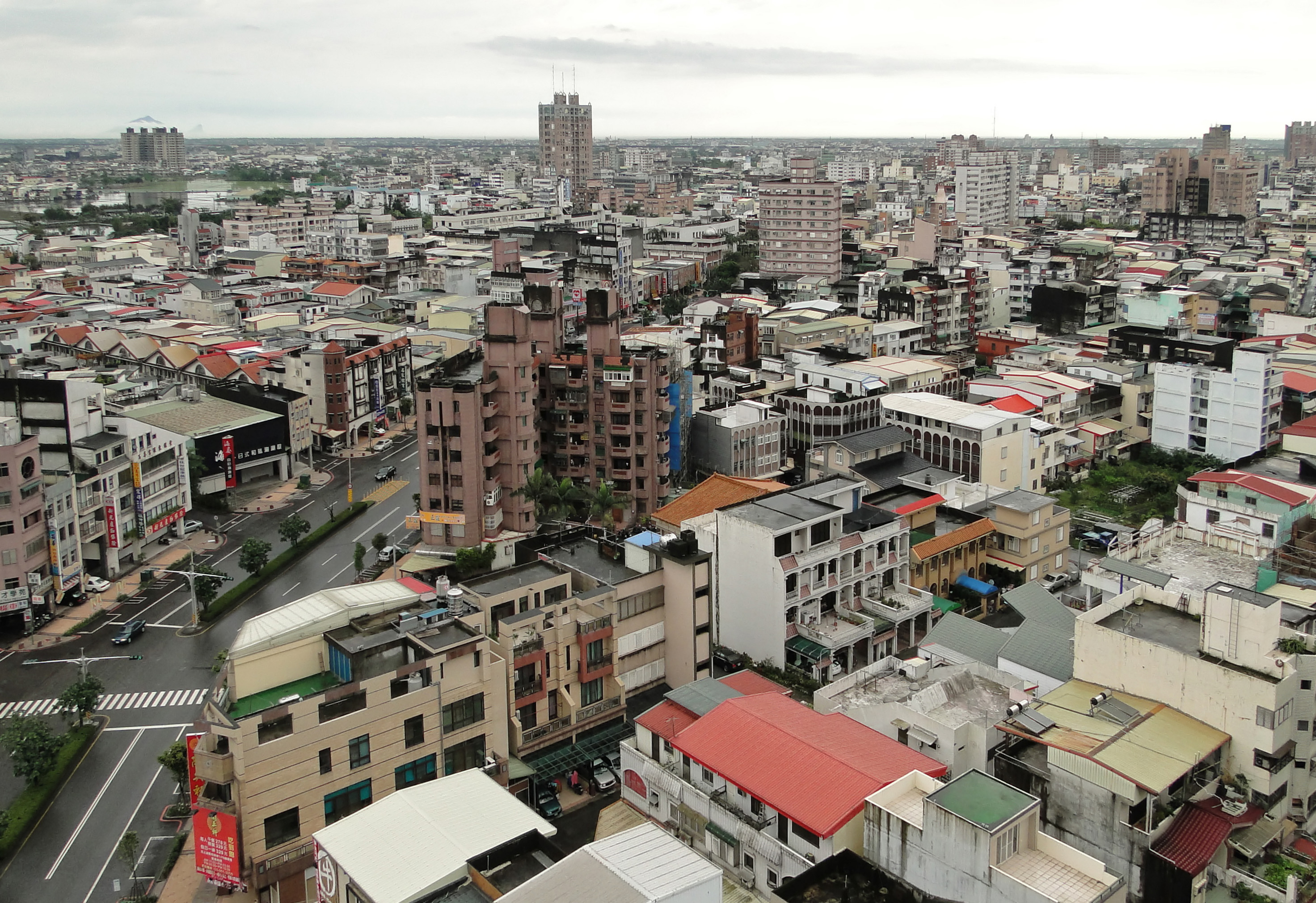

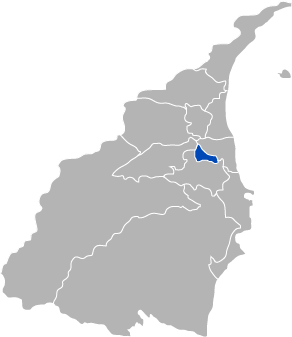
- Luodong Township in Yilan County
- Location: Yilan County, Taiwan

Area
  - Total: 11 km^{2} (4.2 sq mi)

Population (September 2023)
  - Total: 70,002
  - Density: 6,400/km^{2} (16,000/sq mi)
- Website: www.lotong.gov.tw (in Chinese)

Luodong Township (Chinese: 羅東鎮; pinyin: Luódōng Zhèn; Wade–Giles: Lo^{2}-tung^{1} Chen^{4}; Pe̍h-ōe-jī: Lô-tong), sometimes spelled Lotung or Lotong, is an urban township in the central part of Yilan County, Taiwan. Luodong is the smallest township in the county by area.

== Toponym ==
Its name and former name (Chinese: 老懂; Pe̍h-ōe-jī: Lō͘-tóng) derive from the Kavalan word rutung, meaning "monkey", referring to a large population of monkeys there half century ago.

== History ==
=== Qing dynasty ===
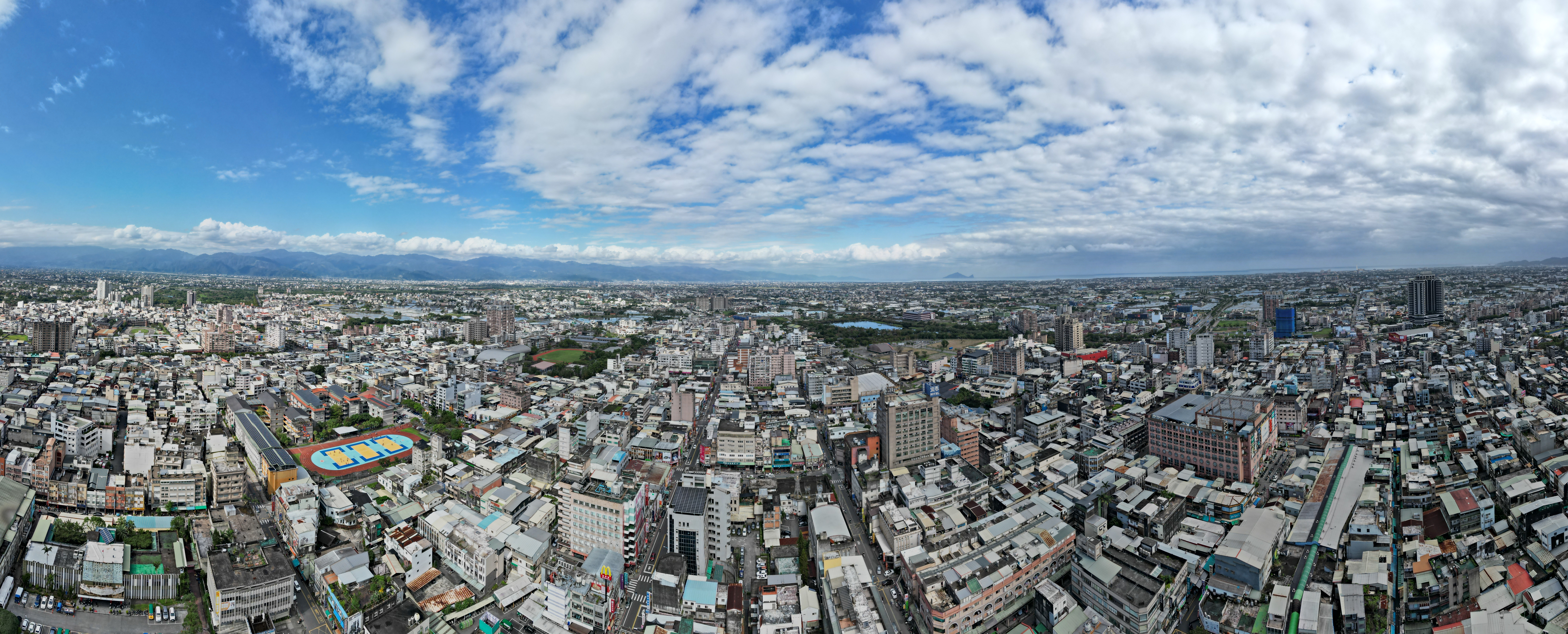
Luodong Township 羅東鎮 is in the central part of Yilan County, Taiwan. This perspective faces the coast and was shot in December 2022.

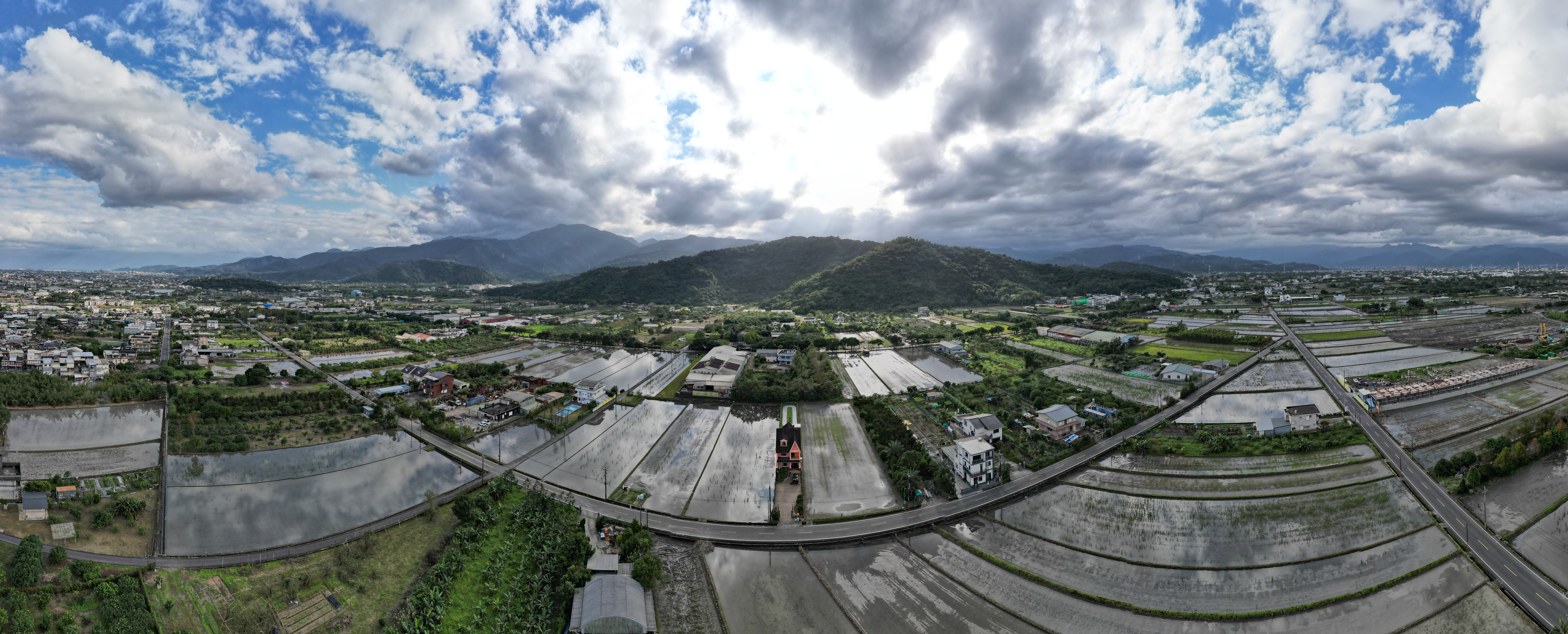
Luodong countryside from above. Shot in December 2022.

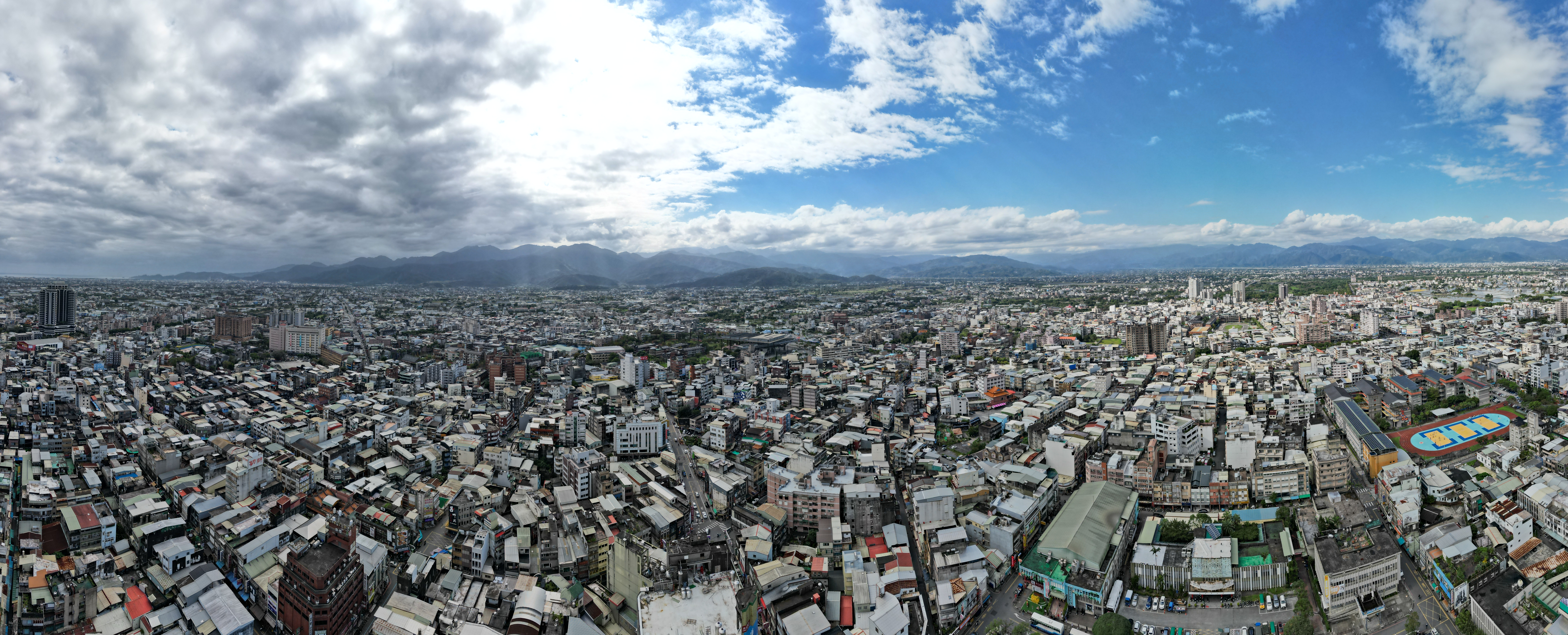
Luodong Township facing the mountains. Shot in December 2022.

In 1804, Pingpu tribe chiefs Pan Xian Wen and Maoge from Changhua led a group of people to settle in the Luodong area, where they established Alishih and Ashushih communities and developed agriculture on a large scale. In 1812, Qing dynasty officer Fan Bang Gan was assigned to Luodong. Two years later, Han settlers entered the region to begin clearing and developing the area. The Pingpu tribe and Han settlers fought over land ownership but eventually they ended up working together to develop Luodong. Years later, Luodong became a developed region with a combination of aboriginal and Han cultures.

=== Japanese Empire ===
Under Japanese rule, Luodong was developed into the base for industries established by the Taiping Mountain logging business. In 1916, the Japanese government established the Giran Branch Office of the Forest Administration Bureau in charge of logging, transportation and storage of Taiping Mountain area timber with a log pond set up in today's Yuanshan Township. The branch office was then later on moved to Luodong due to the change in the lumber transportation from waterway to railway. Finally in 1924, upon the completion of railway connecting Luodong and Tuchang (土場 in Datong), the branch office was officially moved to Chikurin (竹林). From that moment onward, Luodong became a commercial center. From 1920 to 1945, Lutung was administrated as Ratō Town (羅東街) of Taihoku Prefecture.

== Geography ==
Luodong is located on Lanyang Plain. It covers an area of 11.34 square kilometres (4.38 sq mi) and as of September 2023 had a population of 70,002 people. It has a large, landscaped sports park.

== Administrative divisions ==
Luodong Township consists of 25 villages and 524 neighborhoods. Villages in the township are Kaiming, Daxin, Tungan, Xinqun, Luozhuang, Nanchang, Nanhao, Chenggong, Rende, Renhe, Zhongshan, Hanmin, Weiyang, Xian, Beicheng, Guohua, Xianwen, Gongzheng, Jixiang, Xinyi, Shulin, Zhulin and Renai Village.

== Tourist attractions ==
Luodong has a large night market - Luodong Night Market - containing many varieties of local food, such as scallion pancakes. Luodong has a large community which organizes dance clubs and recitals for the elderly. It is also the home of the locally famous Meihua Lake.

Luodong has an excellent natural environment, and is close to both urban Yilan and Su'ao township, popular for its cold and hot springs. It is popular as a destination in the summer for its proximity to the Yilan Children's Festival as well as the farms of Sanxing township. People visit Luodong year-round to enjoy its charming bed and breakfasts.

Luodong Forestry Culture Park is a former timber processing plant that was equipped with sawmills, lumber yards, an agency office, and workers' dormitories. The park still has a complete set of old industry facilities, early village buildings, storage units, and transport machinery.

Another park in the township is Luodong Sports Park.

Festivals in the township include the Luodong Arts Festival Fringe.

== Transportation ==
=== Rail ===
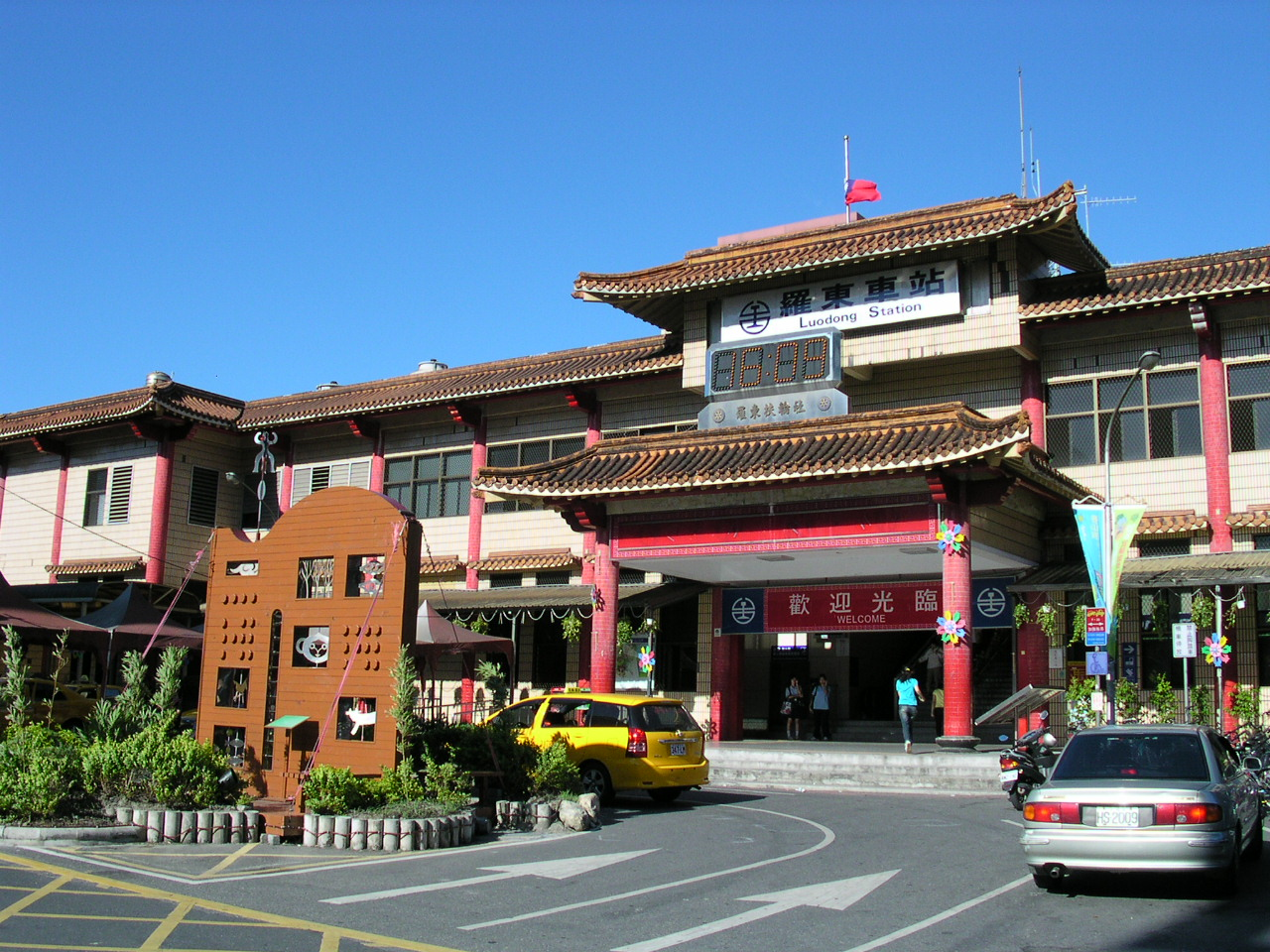
Luodong Station

Luodong is served by the Yilan Line of Taiwan Railway at Luodong Station.

=== Road ===
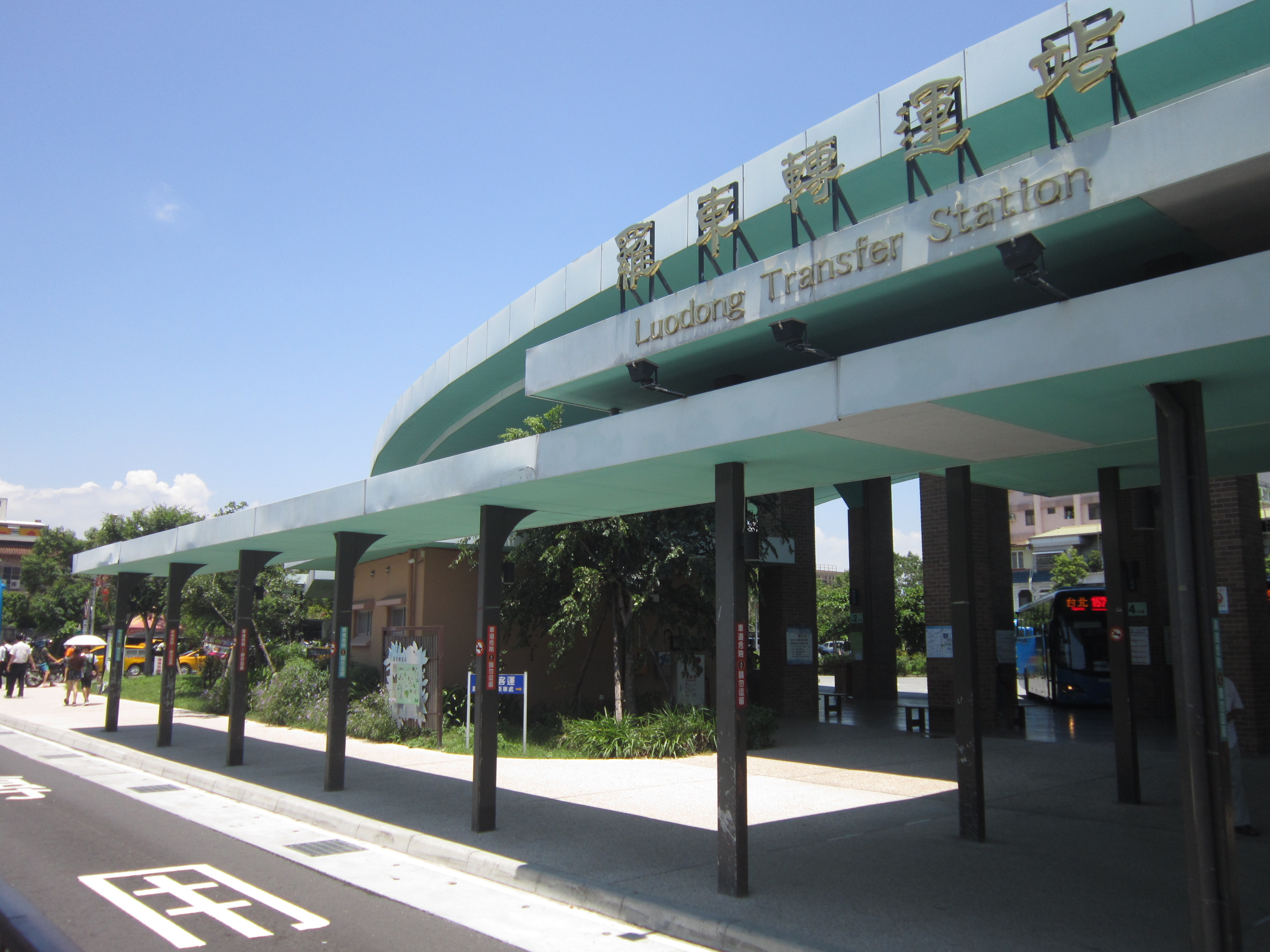
Luodong Transfer Station

The main bus station in the township is Luodong Transfer Station. There are two interchanges in Luodong township along National Highway 5.

== Notable natives ==
- Chen Chin-te, acting Magistrate of Yilan County (2017–2018)
- Huang Chun-ming, novelist and writer
- Lin Mei-hsiu, actress and television host
- Lin Tsung-hsien, Minister of Council of Agriculture (2017–2018)
- Lin Zi-miao, Magistrate of Yilan County
- Ran In-ting, watercolor artist
- Jimmy Liao, illustrator
- Doris Yeh, bassist of Chthonic
- Janez Janež, medical doctor and surgeon

== Sister cities ==
- Saito, Miyazaki, Japan
