= Typhoon Jangmi (2008) =

Pacific typhoon in 2008

Typhoon Jangmi (Ofel)
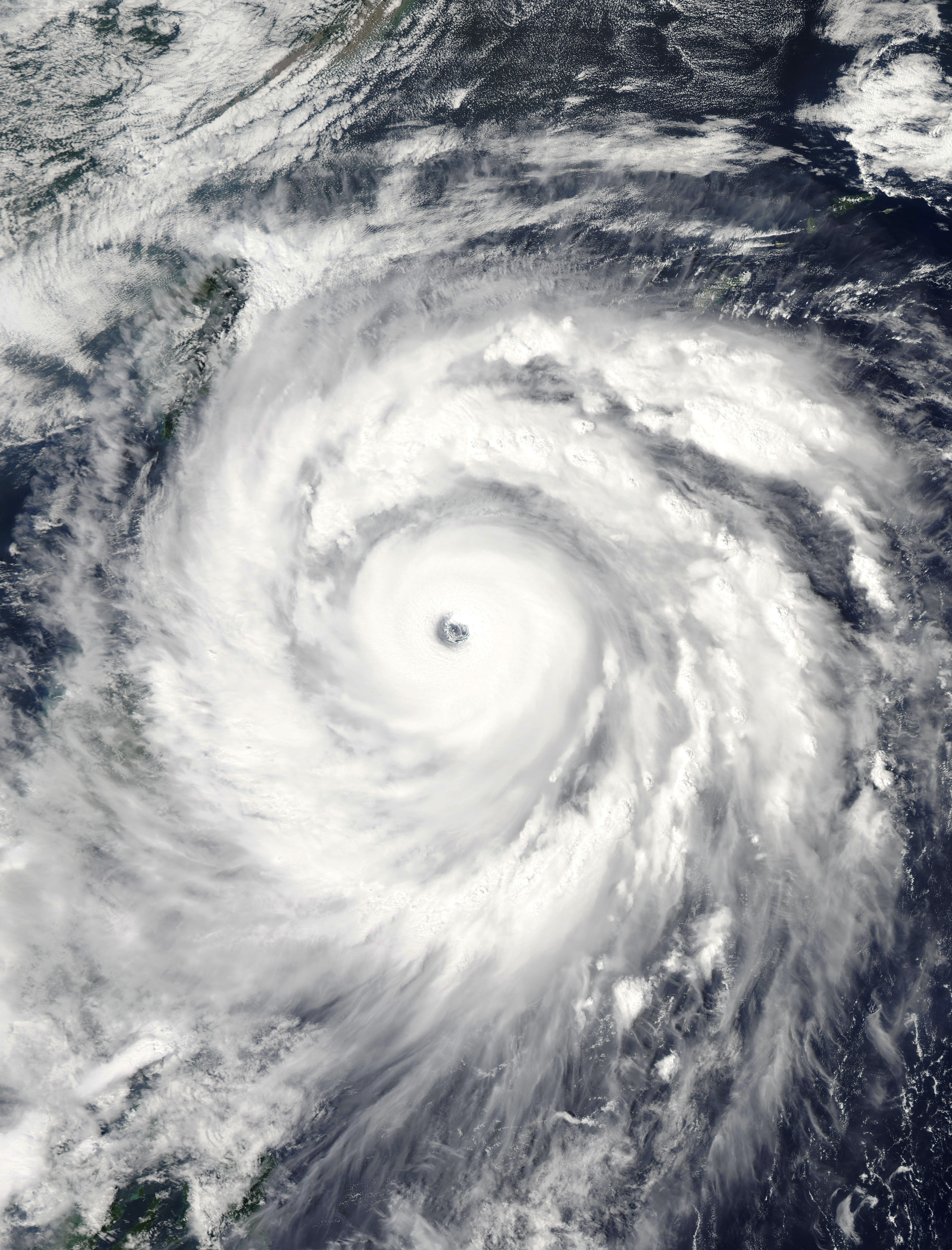
- Jangmi near peak intensity southeast of Taiwan on September 27

Meteorological history
- Formed: September 23, 2008
- Extratropical: October 1, 2008
- Dissipated: October 5, 2008

Violent typhoon
- 10-minute sustained (JMA)
- Highest winds: 215 km/h (130 mph)
- Lowest pressure: 905 hPa (mbar); 26.72 inHg

Category 5-equivalent super typhoon
- 1-minute sustained (SSHWS/JTWC)
- Highest winds: 260 km/h (160 mph)
- Lowest pressure: 918 hPa (mbar); 27.11 inHg

Overall effects
- Fatalities: 6
- Missing: 2
- Damage: $87.7 million (2008 USD)
- Areas affected: Taiwan, eastern China, Japan
- IBTrACS
- Part of the 2008 Pacific typhoon season

Typhoon Jangmi, (Note: The name Jangmi (Korean: 장미, [t͡ɕa̠ŋmi]) was contributed by South Korea and means rose in Korean.) known in the Philippines as Typhoon Ofel, was the most intense tropical cyclone in the Northwest Pacific Ocean during the 2000s, tied with Nida in 2009, and the most intense tropical cyclone worldwide in 2008. Jangmi formed in a low pressure area south of Guam on September 22. After undergoing serious consolidating with convective banding, the low pressure area was upgraded to a Joint Typhoon Warning Center late the same data. Undergoing the same process, the storm developed into a tropical storm on September 24. Undergoing rapid deepening on September 26–27, the storm, now a Super Typhoon entered the Philippine Area of Responsibility, and was named Ofel. The next day, Jangmi made impact in Taiwan, thousands were evacuated, rainfall, up to 994mm were recorded, and thousands of acres of farmland were destroyed. Jangmi was significantly weakened as it interacted with Taiwan, as being downgraded to tropical storm status after leaving Taiwan on September 29. After undergoing an extratropical transition, Jangmi became a remnant low on October 1. After slowly moving eastward, until finally dissipating near Iwo Jima on October 5.

Jangmi killed 2 people and caused about $77.8 million (2008 USD) in damage in Taiwan, as well as the typhoon also made operations of Maokong Gondola suspended due to erosion around a pillar, until March 30, 2010. When Jangmi was weakening and becoming extratropical, it killed 4 people and caused about $9.9 million (2008 USD) in damage in Japan.

== Meteorological history ==
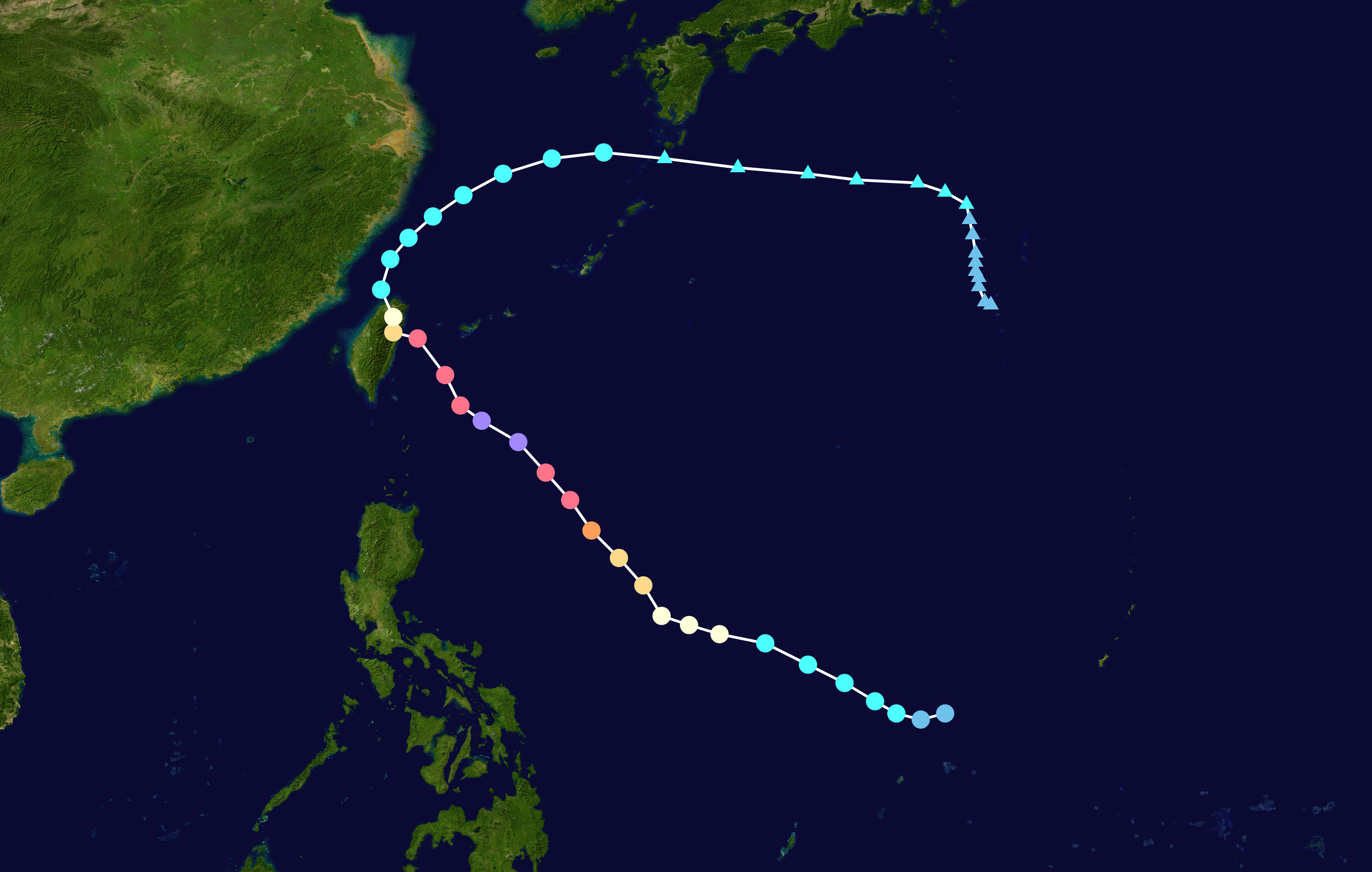
Map plotting the storm's track and intensity, according to the Saffir–Simpson scale Map key Saffir–Simpson scale Tropical depression (≤38 mph, ≤62 km/h) Tropical storm (39–73 mph, 63–118 km/h) Category 1 (74–95 mph, 119–153 km/h) Category 2 (96–110 mph, 154–177 km/h) Category 3 (111–129 mph, 178–208 km/h) Category 4 (130–156 mph, 209–251 km/h) Category 5 (≥157 mph, ≥252 km/h) Unknown Storm type Tropical cyclone Subtropical cyclone Extratropical cyclone, remnant low, tropical disturbance, or monsoon depression

A low-pressure area formed south of Guam on September 22. On the next day, the Joint Typhoon Warning Center (JTWC) issued a Tropical Cyclone Formation Alert on the system. Owing to the low-level circulation center (LLCC) rapidly consolidating with convective banding, JTWC upgraded it to a tropical depression late on the same day. Overall, the environment was favorable for further development, with a developing anticyclone over the LLCC, weak vertical wind shear, and good poleward outflow due to a cold-core low north of the system. Early on September 24, JTWC upgraded the system to a tropical storm; however, according to RSMC Best Track Data, the system intensified into a tropical depression at the same time. At noon, the Japan Meteorological Agency (JMA) upgraded the system to a tropical storm and named it Jangmi, when it was tracking northwestward under the steering influence of the subtropical ridge in the northeast. Several hours later, Jangmi entered the Philippine Area of Responsibility, earning the name Ofel from the Philippine Atmospheric, Geophysical and Astronomical Services Administration (PAGASA).

Shortly after JMA upgraded Jangmi to a severe tropical storm early on September 25, JTWC upgraded it to a typhoon for its developing eye; moreover, according to RSMC Best Track Data, Jangmi intensified into a typhoon simultaneously. Tracking toward a weakness in the subtropical ridge induced by a mid-latitude trough to the north-northeast on September 26, Jangmi formed an cirrus-filled and ambiguous eye, as the typhoon gradually intensified owing to strong radial outflow provided by a mesoscale anticyclone aloft, which persisted into a tropical upper tropospheric trough cell to the east. At 00:00 UTC on September 27, JTWC upgraded Jangmi to a super typhoon, with a round 28 nautical miles (52 km; 32 mi) eye with an intense and symmetric core of deep convection and excellent convective banding over all quadrants. Six hours later, the typhoon reached category 5 strength on the Saffir–Simpson hurricane wind scale with maximum sustained winds of 260 km/h (160 mph), after Hurricane Hunters found flight-level winds of 302 km/h (188 mph) and a minimum pressure of 905 hPa (26.7 inHg). By 12:00 UTC, the JMA assessed Jangmi to have peaked with ten-minute maximum sustained winds of 215 km/h (130 mph) and minimum pressure at the aforementioned value based on the aircraft data, making it the most intense the Northwest Pacific Ocean since Angela in 1995.

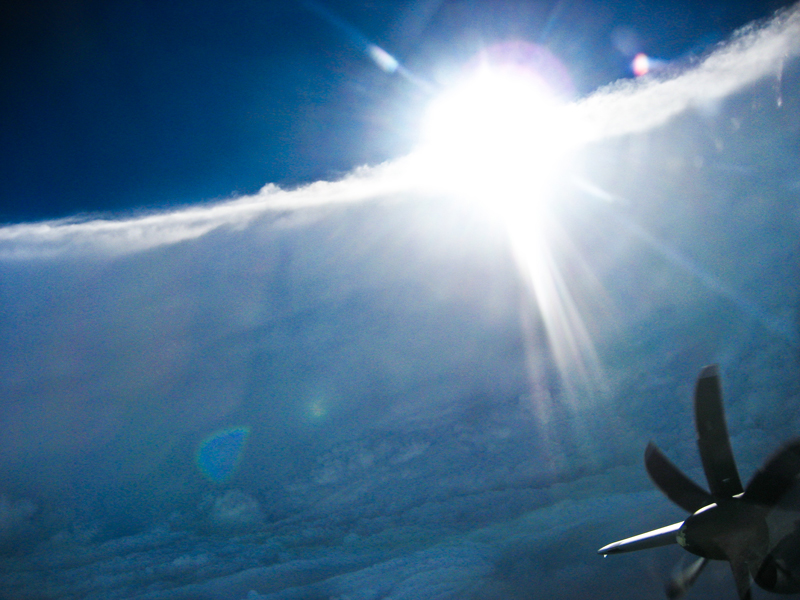
The eye of Typhoon Jangmi as seen by Hurricane Hunters on September 27

Jangmi weakened gradually due to land interaction with Taiwan early on September 28. After JTWC downgraded Jangmi to a typhoon, it made landfall over Nan'ao in Yilan, Taiwan at 15:40 TST (07:40 UTC) with ten-minute maximum sustained winds of 100 knots (185 km/h, 115 mph) and an atmospheric pressure of 925 hPa (27.3 inHg). Because of the frictional effects of land, the typhoon showed trochoidal motion overland, unexpectedly shifting toward the south-southwest shortly. Jangmi weakened significantly by the mountainous terrain of Taiwan after landfall; therefore, it lost the majority of deep convection. Under the steering influence by the eastern subtropical ridge, the system began to track northward toward a break situated east of Shanghai, China, and it emerged into the Taiwan Strait from Taoyuan County (now Taoyuan City) at 04:20 TST on September 29 (20:20 UTC on September 28). Early on September 29, Jangmi weakened into a severe tropical storm in the East China Sea, when JTWC downgraded it to a tropical storm. As JMA downgraded Jangmi to a tropical storm at noon, the system started to track northeastward along the weakened western finger of the subtropical ridge. Jangmi underwent extratropical transition while accelerating east-northeastward and then eastward on September 30, as well as upper-level westerly winds sheared the remaining convection to the east and south of the low-level circulation center with frontal features. Late on the same day, JTWC reported that Jangmi became extratropical with a final warning. JMA reported that Jangmi became an extratropical cyclone near the Ōsumi Islands early on October 1, and the system kept moving eastward rapidly during that day. Remaining weak and shallow, it began to drift east-southeastward slowly by early on October 2. Since the noon on the same day, the system turned to drift southward very slowly. It ultimately dissipated near Iwo Jima on October 5.

== Impacts ==
=== Taiwan ===
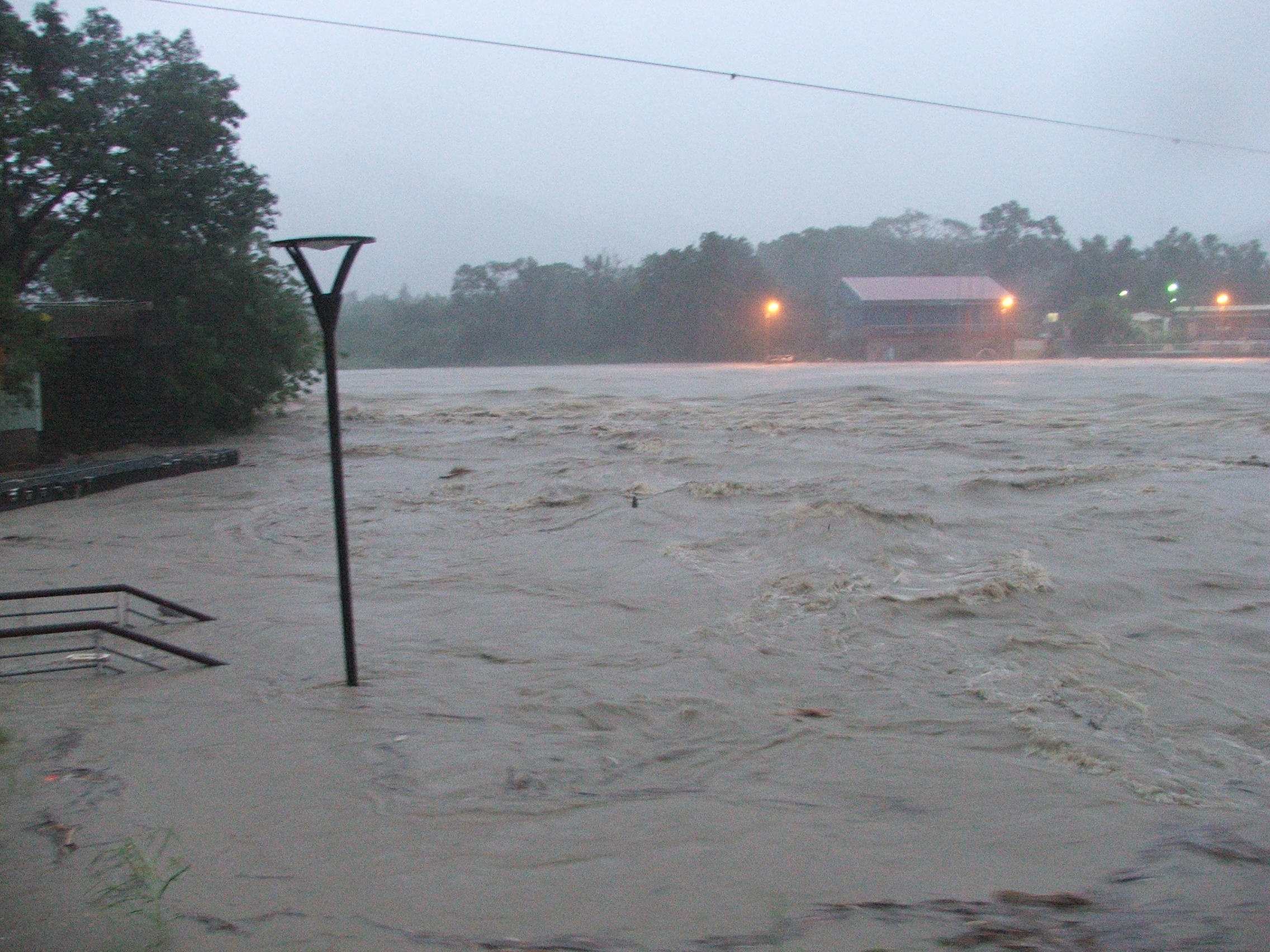
The Xindian Creek on September 28

Typhoon Jangmi brought torrential rainfall throughout the mountains in Taiwan on September 27–29, where were already severely affected by Typhoon Sinlaku in early September. 1,134 mm (44.6 in) of precipitation was recorded at Taiping Mountain in Datong, Yilan. Jangmi also brought 994 mm (39.1 in) in Zhuqi, Chiayi and 857 mm (33.7 in) in Beitou, Taipei. 3,661 people were evacuated, and 1,040,880 residences in Taiwan lost power because of the typhoon.

The typhoon caused 2 fatalities and 61 injures in Taiwan, while 2 people are still missing. On National Highway No. 5 in Su'ao, Yilan, a bus was blown over by the strong winds, injuring 36 passengers inside. In Qingshui, Taichung, an 18-year-old female was strangled to death by a falling coaxial cable of cable television when riding a motorcycle. In Wuqi, Taichung, an 82-year-old male was killed by blown into a flooded rice paddy when riding a bike.

Maokong Gondola

The heavy rains brought by Typhoon Jangmi caused a landslide on the mountain slope near the Maokong Gondola Tower No. 16 on September 28. Considering local residents’ worries, On October 1, the Taipei City Government announced that the Maokong Gondola would temporarily suspend service and carry out further assessment; based on the suggestions made by construction, environment protection, and geological associations, it was decided that Tower No. 16 should be moved.

The New Construction Office of Taipei City Government completed the work of moving T16 tower base and re-hanging cable on January 31, 2010. After examination of operational simulation by TRTC, the system met the requirements by the inspection committee on March 4, 2010. The Maokong Gondola eventually resumed normal operations on March 30, 2010.

=== Japan ===
Typhoon Jangmi brought strong winds and heavy rainfall to Okinawa, peaking at 162 in (4,100 mm) to the islands on September 27–29. Ishigaki Island sustained the most severe damage after a dike collapsed, flooding the surrounding areas. Much of the prefecture was left without power as winds gusted to 110 km/h (70 mph). Throughout the prefecture, four people were killed and six others were injured, two of whom sustained severe injuries. Damage from the storm amounted to 65.2 million yen (US$746,670). By October 1, the remnants of Jangmi brought heavy rains and strong winds to Kyūshū. The highest rainfall total was measured in Satsumakashiwabaru, in the Kagoshima Prefecture, at 380 mm (15 in). In the prefecture, these rains triggered 42 landslides and flooded seven homes, three of which were left with severe damage. A total of 334 hectares of farmland was damaged by Jangmi, leaving 15.4 million yen (US$176,360) in losses. In Miyazaki Prefecture, one person was injured and three homes were damaged after a hillside collapsed.

== See also ==
- Other tropical cyclones named Jangmi
- Other tropical cyclones named Ofel
- Typhoon Krosa (2007)
- Typhoon Sinlaku (2008)
