= Qingshui Geothermal Park =

Park in Datong, Yilan County, Taiwan

Qingshui Geothermal Park 清水地熱公園
- Geothermal area
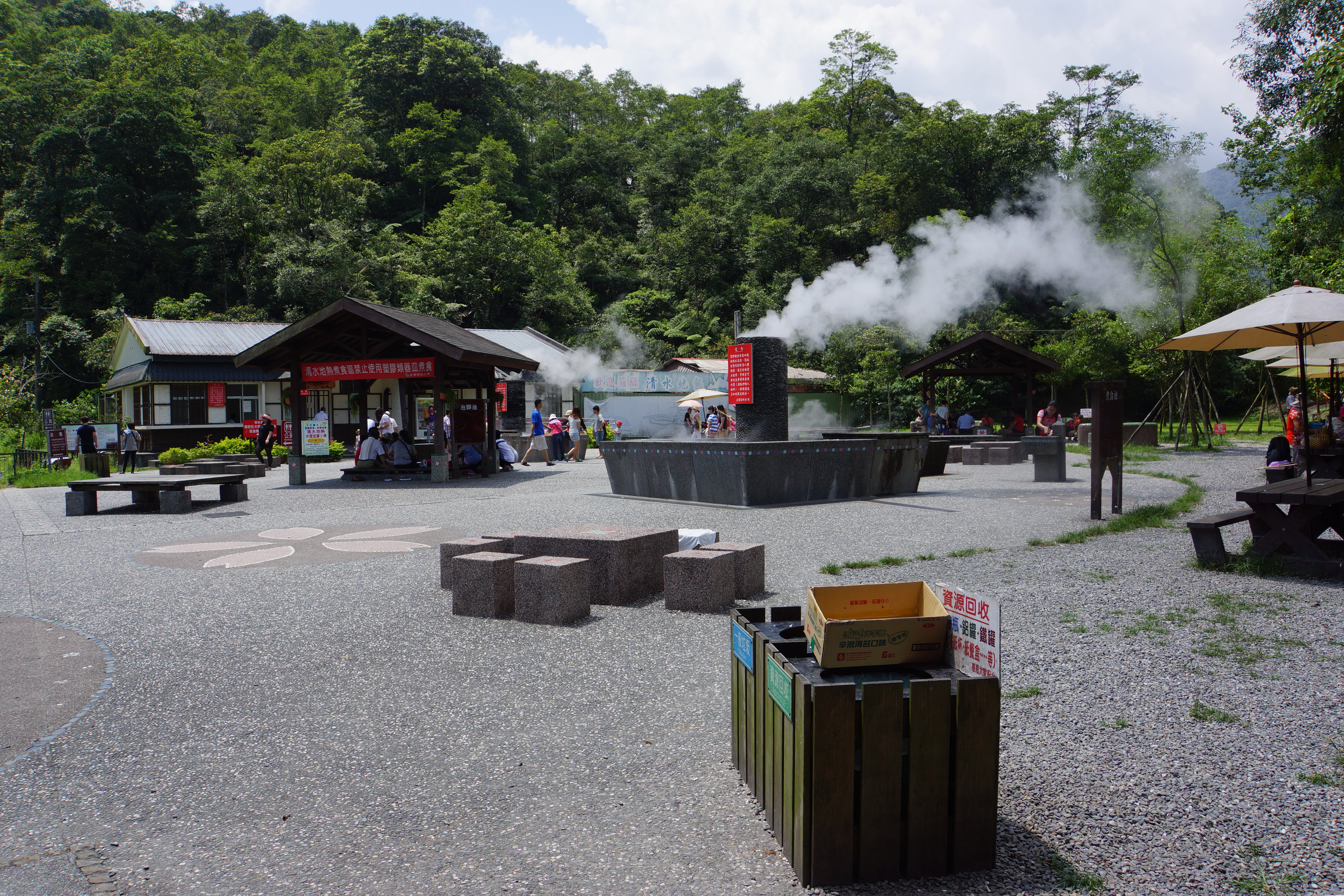

- Coordinates: 24°36′42.8″N 121°38′11.7″E
- Location: Datong, Yilan County, Taiwan

The Qingshui Geothermal Park (traditional Chinese: 清水地熱公園; simplified Chinese: 清水地热公园; pinyin: Qīngshuǐ Dìrè Gōngyuán) is a geothermal area in Datong Township, Yilan County, Taiwan.

== History ==
The park used to be the old workstation of CPC Corporation. The park was closed from 13 May until 8 June 2021, due to the surging of COVID-19 pandemic.

== Geology ==
The park is located at the valley of the Qingshui River. The water from the park has a temperature of 95–104 °C.

== Architecture ==
The park consists of cooking pools, foot baths, rest area, selling area etc.

== See also ==
- Geothermal energy in Taiwan
