= Qingshui Geothermal Power Plant =

Geothermal power plant in Datong, Yilan County, Taiwan

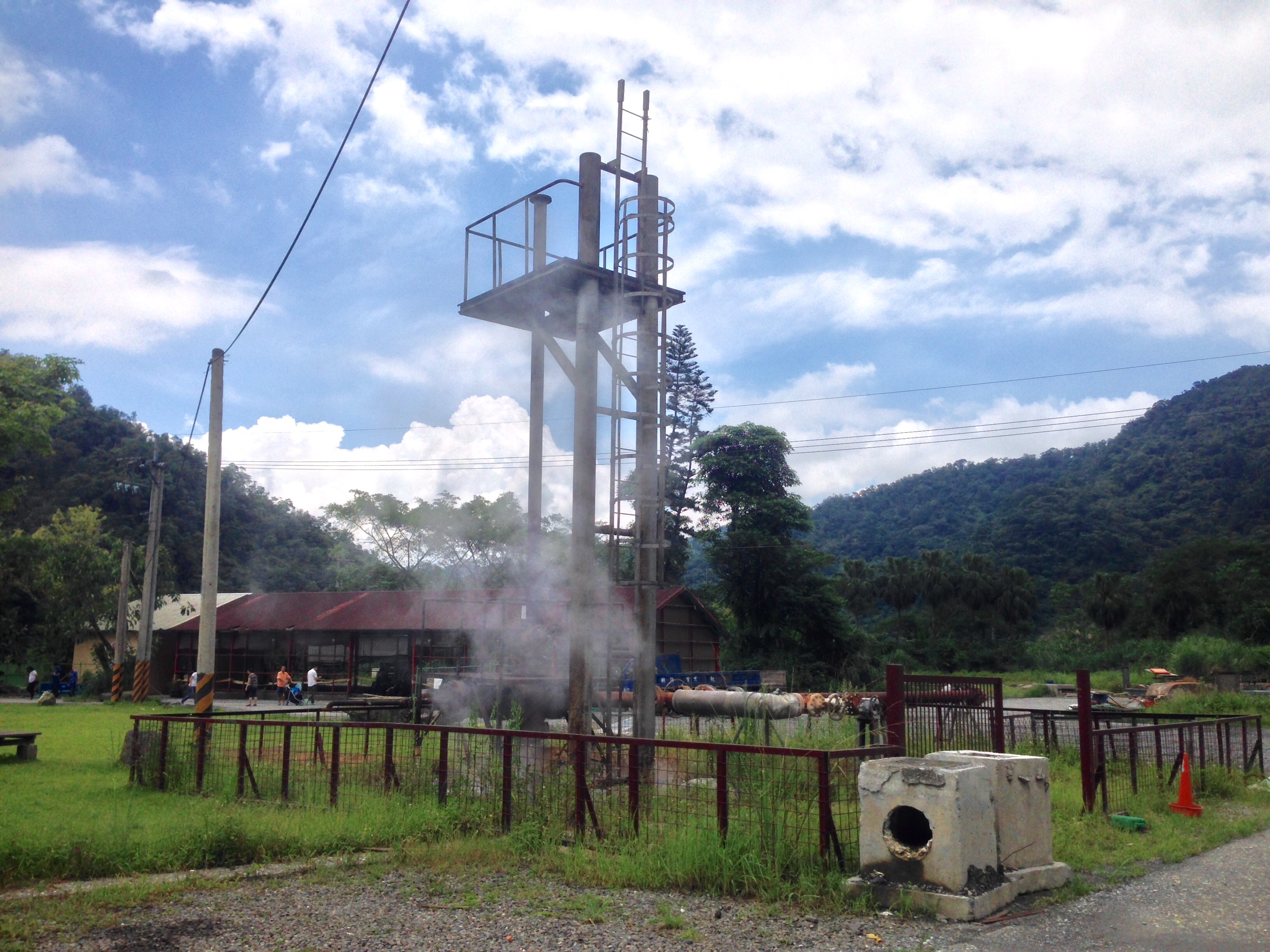
- Official name: 清水地熱發電廠
- Country: Taiwan
- Location: Datong, Yilan County, Taiwan
- Coordinates: 24°36′44.3″N 121°38′13.1″E
- Status: Operational
- Commission date: 23 November 2021
- Construction cost: NT$765 million
- Owner: Fabulous Power Co.
- Operator: Fabulous Power Co.

Geothermal power station
- Min. source temp.: 180°C
- Max. well depth: 2,100 m

Power generation
- Nameplate capacity: 4.2 MW

External links
- Commons: Related media on Commons

The Qingshui Geothermal Power Plant (traditional Chinese: 清水地熱發電廠; simplified Chinese: 清水地热发电厂; pinyin: Qīngshuǐ Dìrè Fādiànchǎng) is a geothermal power plant in Datong Township, Yilan County, Taiwan.

== History ==
In 2017, Fabulous Power Co. won the right to use the land where the plant stands today. The construction of the power plant was completed in September 2021 and was approved to be commissioned on 27 October the same year. It was then commissioned on 23 November 2021.

== Technical specifications ==
The power plant has an installed generation capacity of 4.2 MW. The temperature of the geothermal reservoir is around 180°C with a depth of 1,200–2,100 meters. It has an hourly power generation capacity of 3,150 kWh.

== Finance ==
The power plant was constructed with a cost of NT$765 million. Yiyuan, the company that invested into the power plant, was granted the permit to operate the power purchase agreement for 20 years, in which it will pay the government NT$2 million annually.

== See also ==
- Geothermal energy in Taiwan
- List of power stations in Taiwan
