= Mingchi National Forest Recreation Area =

Forest in Datong, Yilan County, Taiwan

Mingchi National Forest Recreation Area Chinese: 明池國家森林遊樂區
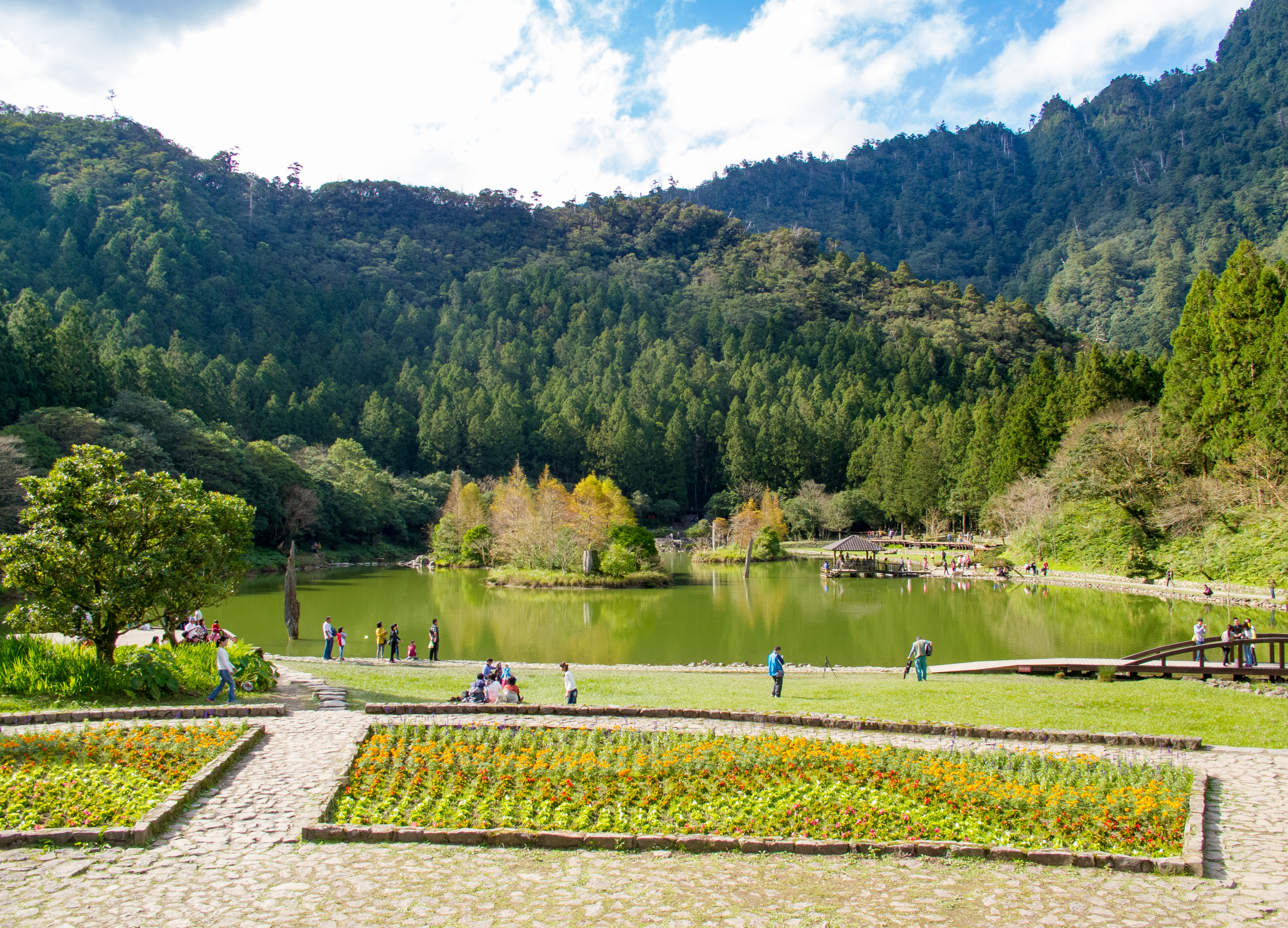

- Location within Taiwan
- Interactive map of Mingchi National Forest Recreation Area

Geography
- Location: Datong, Yilan County, Taiwan
- Coordinates: 24°39′02.4″N 121°28′23.4″E
- Elevation: 1,150–1,700 m (3,770–5,580 ft)

Mingchi National Forest Recreation Area (traditional Chinese: 明池國家森林遊樂區; simplified Chinese: 明池国家森林游乐区; pinyin: Míngchí Guójiā Sēnlín Yóulè Qū) is a forest located in Datong Township, Yilan County, Taiwan. It is also named as the Pearl of the North Cross-Island Highway.

== Geology ==
The forest is located at an altitude of 1,150-1,700 meters.

== Architecture ==
The forest features an artificial lake surrounded by gardens designed with Chinese architectural style. It also consists of Ci Garden, Fern Garden, Stone Garden, Sun Yat-sen Memorial Garden and forest trails. It also consists of hostels and lookout pavilion.

== See also ==
- Geography of Taiwan
