= List of storms named Ofel =

The name Ofel has been used for five tropical cyclones in the Philippine Area of Responsibility in the West Pacific Ocean:

- Tropical Storm Haima (2004) (T0420, 24W, Ofel) – affected China and Taiwan
- Typhoon Jangmi (2008) (T0815, 19W, Ofel) – struck Taiwan and approached Japan
- Typhoon Son-Tinh (2012) (T1223, 24W, Ofel) – battered Hainan, Vietnam, and Philippines
- Tropical Depression Ofel (2020) – traversed from the Philippines to Vietnam
- Typhoon Usagi (2024) (T2425, 27W, Ofel) – brushed the Philippines and Taiwan.

The name Ofel was retired following the 2024 season and replaced with Onos, which refers to a local storm god that released a massive deluge in Bicol.
