= Jiuliao River Ecological Park =

Park in Datong, Yilan County, Taiwan

- 九寮溪教育生態園區
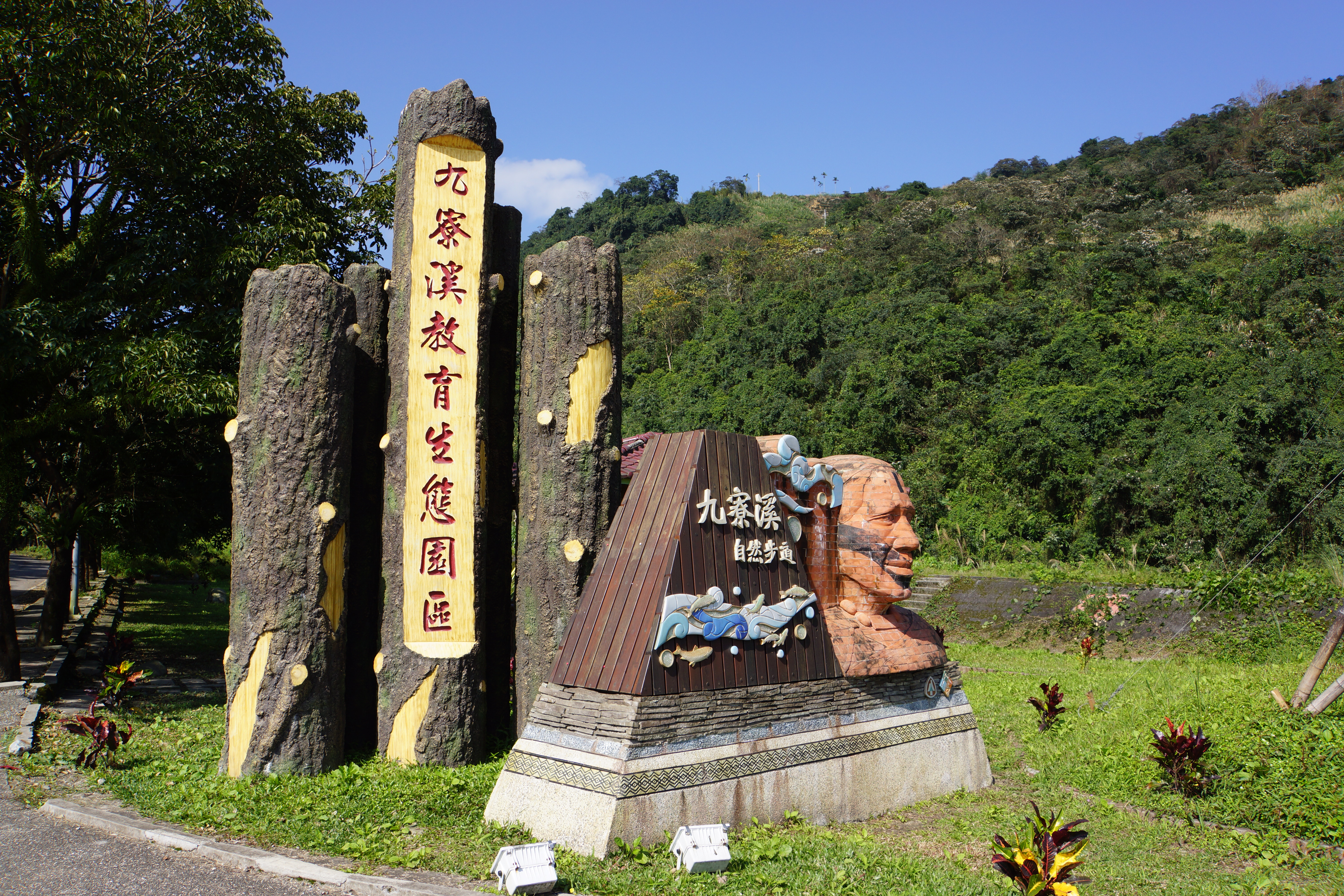
- Interactive map of Jiuliao River Ecological Park
- Type: park
- Location: Datong, Yilan County, Taiwan
- Coordinates: 24°40′26″N 121°35′54″E

Jinhua Park (traditional Chinese: 九寮溪教育生態園區; simplified Chinese: 九寮溪教育生态园区; pinyin: Jiǔliáo Xī Jiàoyù Shēngtài Yuánqū) is a park in Lunpi Village, Datong Township, Yilan County, Taiwan.

== Geology ==
The park is located along the Jiuiao River which its upstream is originated from Xueshan in Heping District, Taichung.

== Architecture ==
The park features various facilities such, as barbecue area and exhibitions, as well as 1.8 km long trail.

== See also ==
- List of parks in Taiwan
- List of tourist attractions in Taiwan
