= Qilan Forest Recreation Area =

Forest in Datong, Yilan County, Taiwan

Qilan Forest Recreation Area Chinese: 棲蘭森林遊樂區
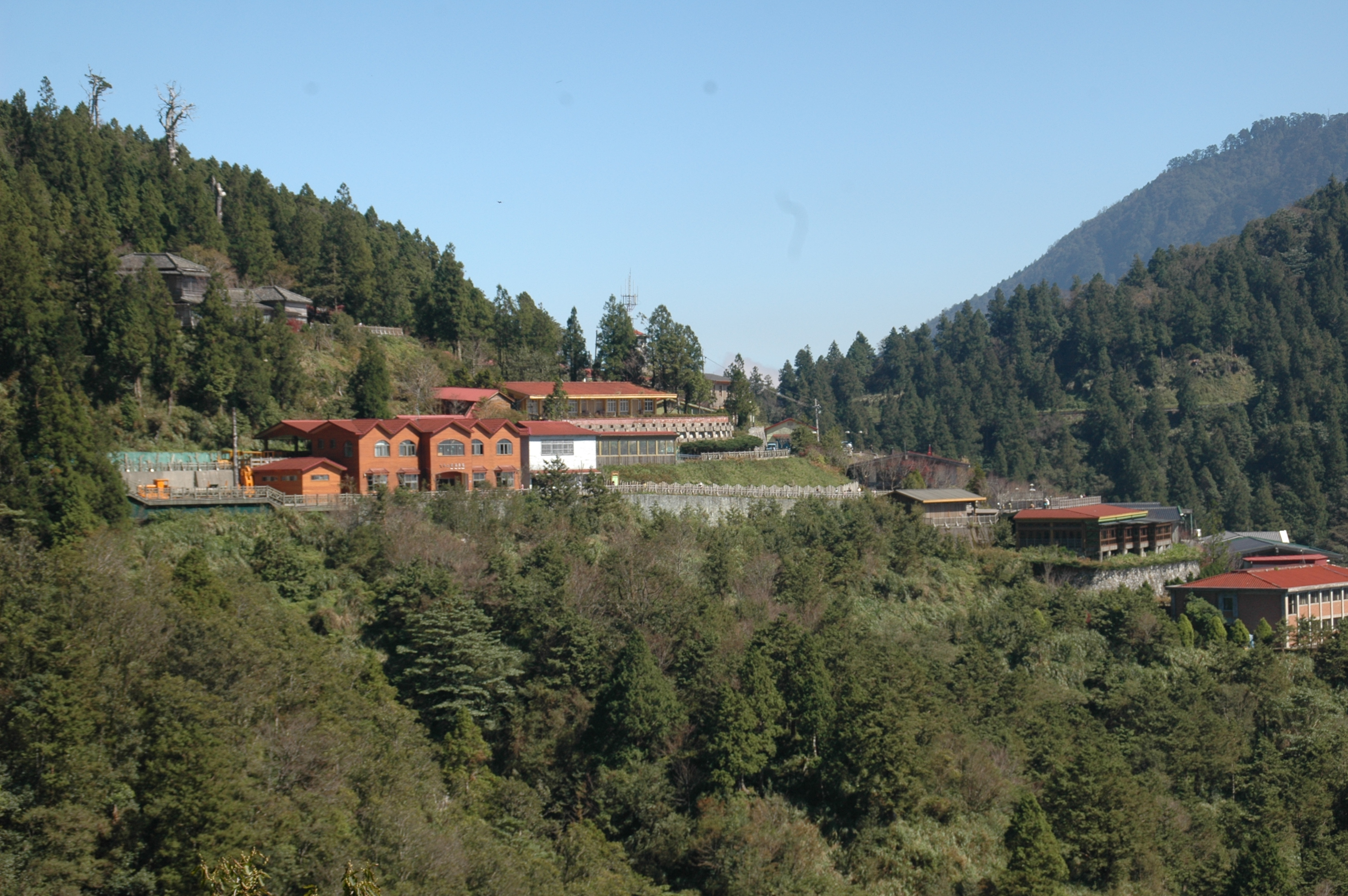

- Location within Taiwan
- Interactive map of Qilan Forest Recreation Area

Geography
- Location: Datong, Yilan County, Taiwan
- Coordinates: 24°35′01.5″N 121°29′26.7″E

Qilan Forest Recreation Area (simplified Chinese: 栖兰森林游乐区; traditional Chinese: 棲蘭森林遊樂區; pinyin: Qīlán Sēnlín Yóulè Qū) is a forest located in Datong Township, Yilan County, Taiwan.

== Architecture ==
The forest consists of villa used by former President Chiang Kai-shek, walking trails etc. It was constructed with European-style architecture. It also consists of hotel rooms and wood cottages, as well as a restaurant.

== Ecology ==
The forests consists of Taiwan's largest giant tree cluster. It also consists of cherry and peaches blossom area.

== Transportation ==
The forest is accessible by bus from Yilan Station or Luodong Station.

== See also ==
- Geography of Taiwan
