= Atayal Life Museum =

Museum in Datong, Yilan County, Taiwan

- 泰雅生活館
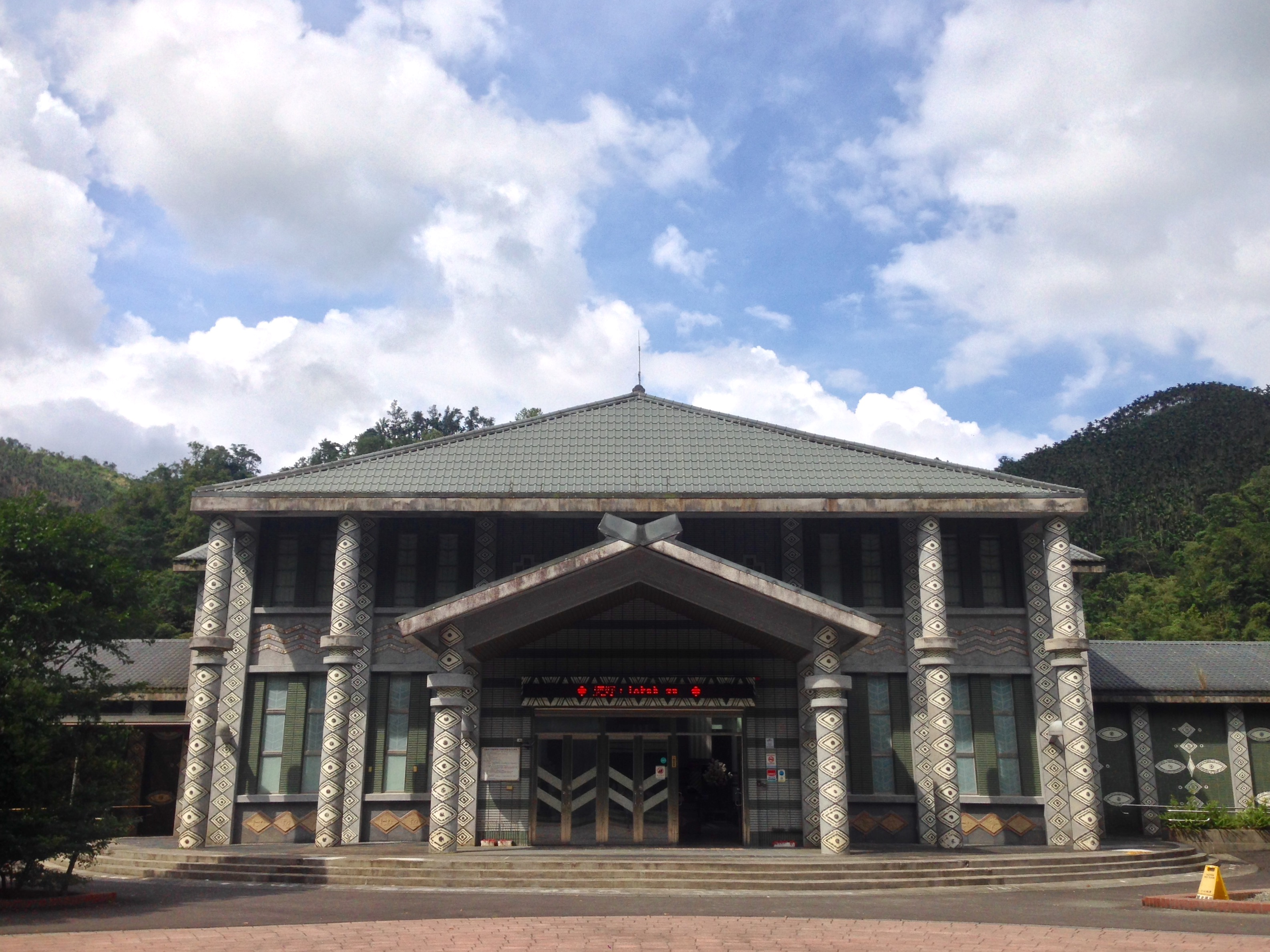
- Established: 2008
- Location: Datong, Yilan County, Taiwan
- Coordinates: 24°40′49.9″N 121°36′26.4″E
- Type: museum

The Atayal Life Museum (traditional Chinese: 泰雅生活館; simplified Chinese: 泰雅生活馆; pinyin: Tàiyǎ Shēnghuó Guǎn) is a museum about Atayal people in Datong Township, Yilan County, Taiwan.

== History ==
The museum was opened in 2008.

== Exhibitions ==
The museum exhibits various cultural relics of Atayal people.

== Activities ==
The museum preserves, collects and conducts research on Atayal culture. It also regularly holds various arts and cultural performances.

== See also ==
- List of museums in Taiwan
- Taiwanese indigenous peoples
