= Geothermal energy in Taiwan =

Energy in Taiwan

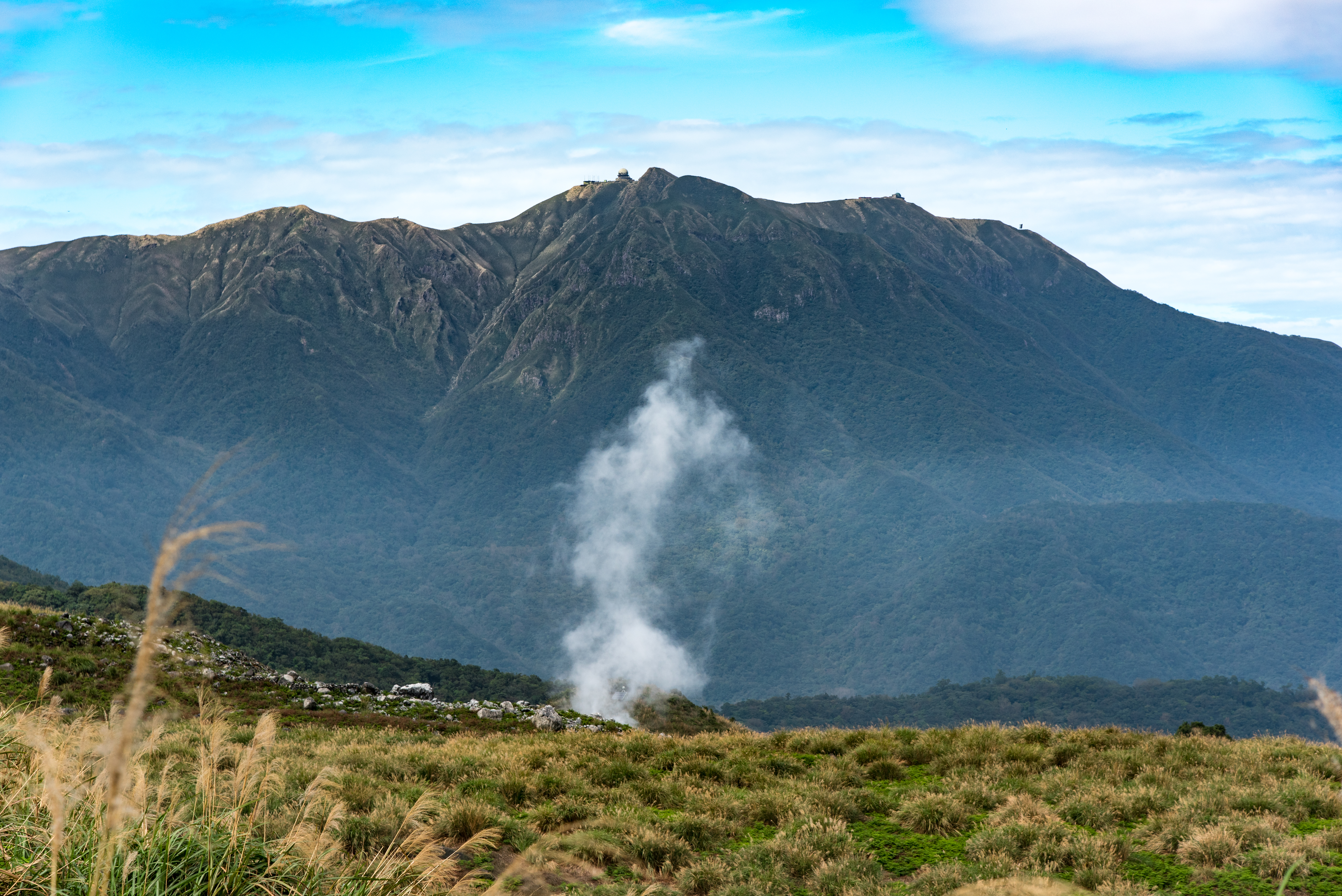
Geothermal vapor at Yangmingshan.

Geothermal energy in Taiwan is estimated to have a generation potential of up to 30,000 MW.

== History ==
Exploration of geothermal wells in Taiwan began in 1976 by CPC Corporation. Since then, there have been 34 wells drilled.

== Geology ==
There are estimated several areas with highest potential for geothermal energy cultivation, which are Huadong Valley, Mount Lu, Tatun Volcanic Group and Yilan Plain.

== Power generation ==
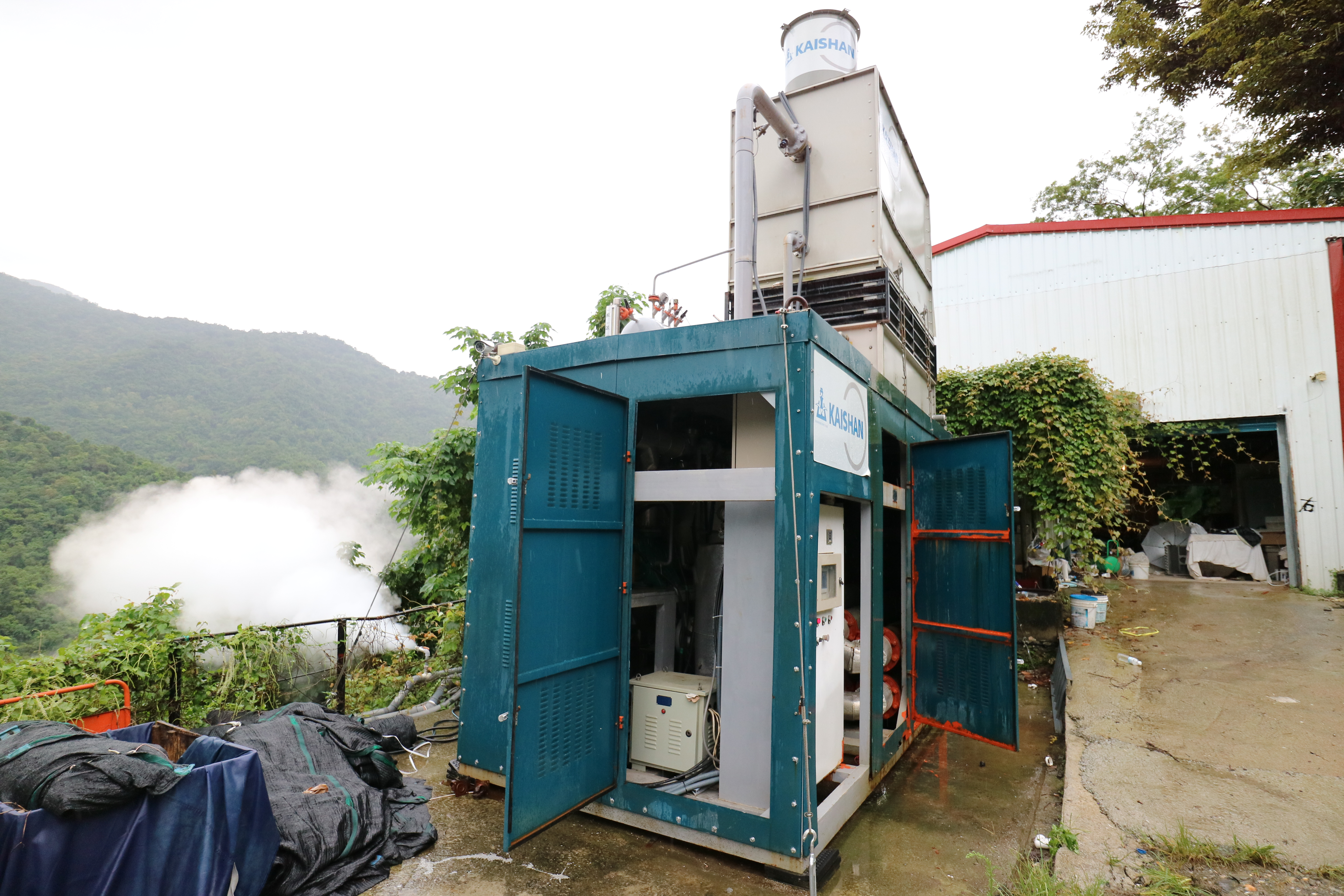
Rainbow Resort Geothermal Power Plant in Beinan Township, Taitung County.

Taiwan established its first geothermal power plant in 1981. However, the plant was shut down in 1993 due to low efficiency. The currently working geothermal power plant is the Qingshui Geothermal Power Plant in Datong Township, Yilan County.

== See also ==
- Renewable energy in Taiwan
