= Taiping Mountain =

Mountain in Datong, Yilan County, Taiwan

Mount Taiping
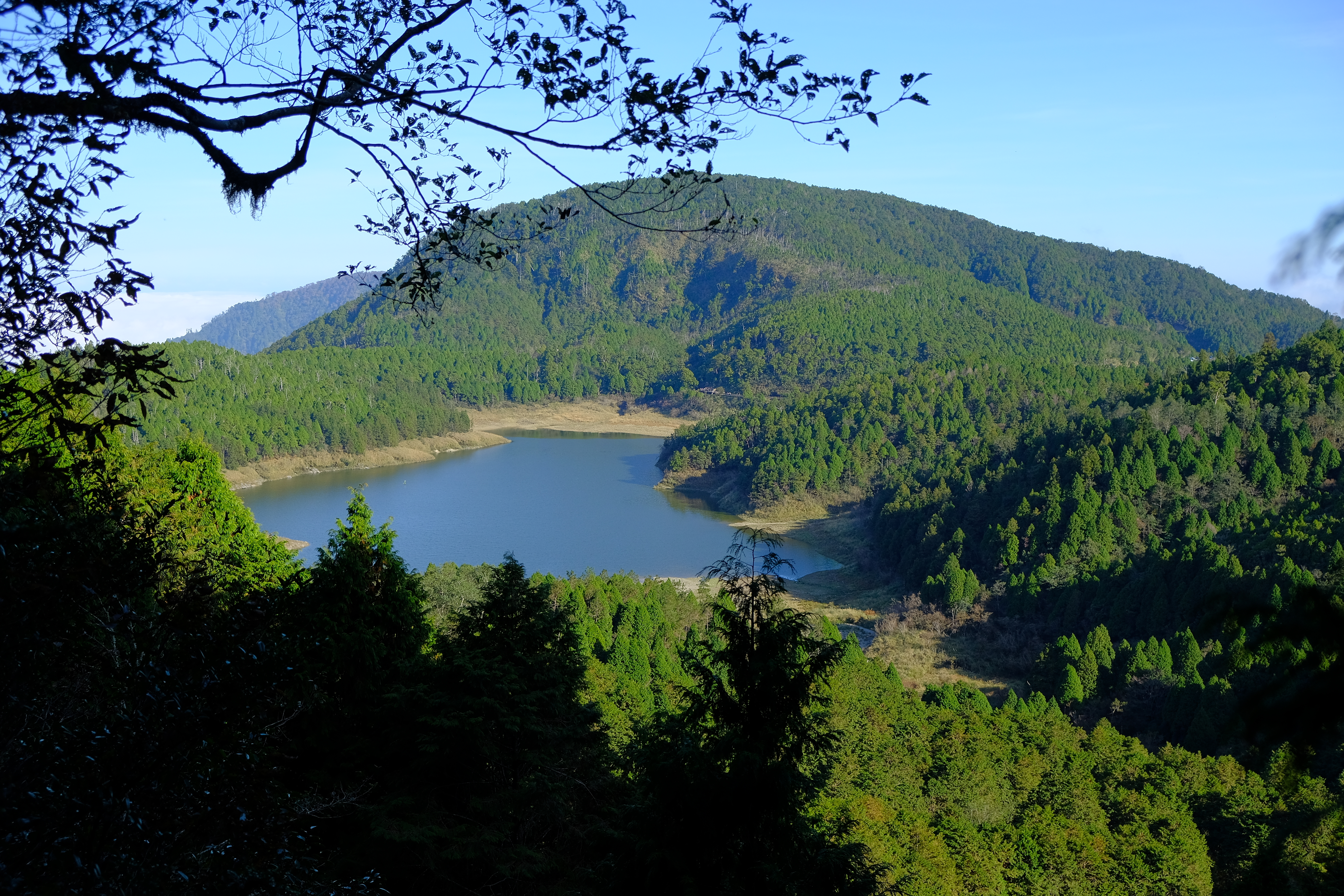

Highest point
- Elevation: 1,950 m (6,400 ft)
- Coordinates: 24°29′37″N 121°32′06″E

Naming
- Native name: 太平山 (Chinese)

Geography
- Location within Taiwan
- Location: Datong, Yilan County, Taiwan

Taiping Mountain or Taipingshan (Chinese: 太平山; pinyin: Tàipíngshān) is a mountain in Datong Township, Yilan County, Taiwan. It is one of Taiwan's three major forest recreation areas. At 1,950 meters (6,397 feet) above sea level, Taiping Mountain has nurtured an environment rich in ecological resources. In Taipingshan National Forest Recreation Area (太平山國家森林遊樂區), people go up the Taiping Mountain Virgin Forest Park to ride the Pong Pong Train, that runs on a track remodeled from the lumber rail in the old days. One could still see the lumber-cutting facilities and operating tools such as the cable transport, aerial lift, lumber rail and steam-powered timber hoist that have remained. These offer visitors an opportunity to learn about the early forest industry in Taiwan as well as to see the natural landscape in high mountains. Taipingshan received 1,015 mm (40.0 in) rain from Typhoon Megi in 2016, the highest in Taiwan.

== Gallery ==
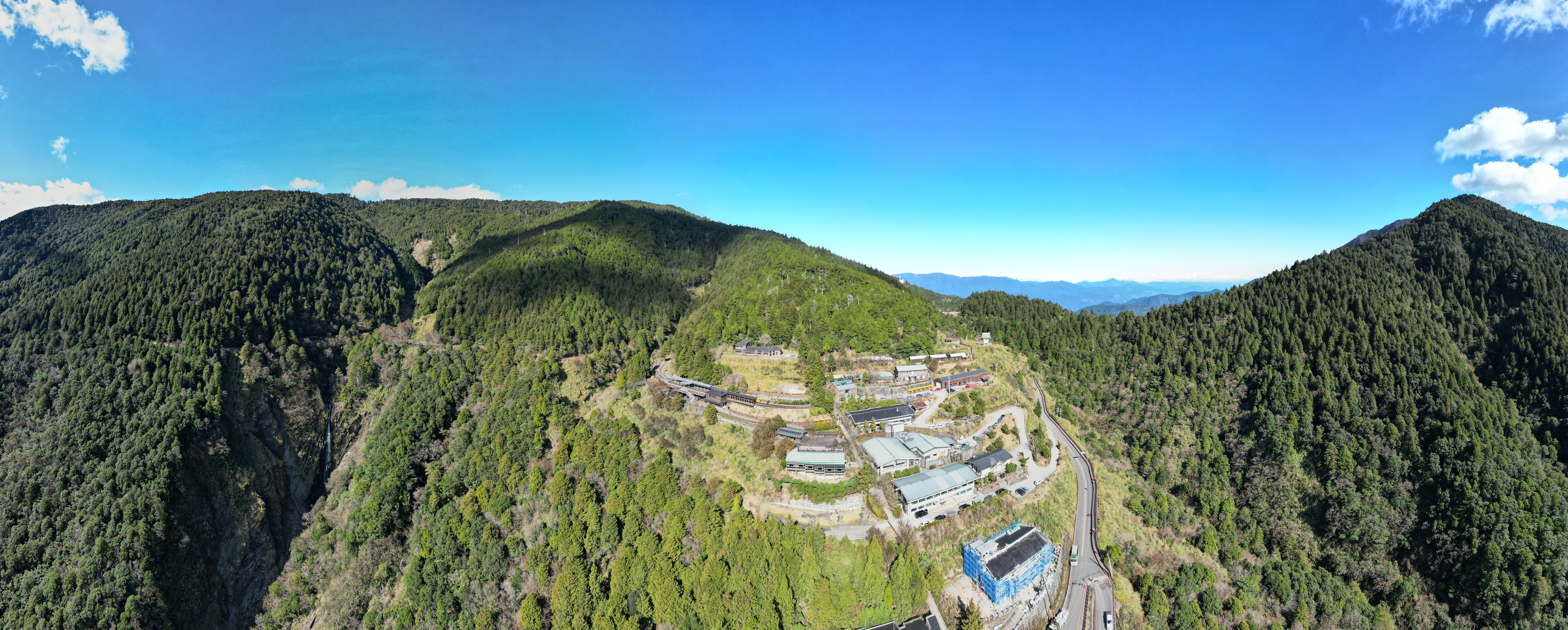
Aerial panorama of Taiping Mountain villa and visitor centre. Shot December 2022.

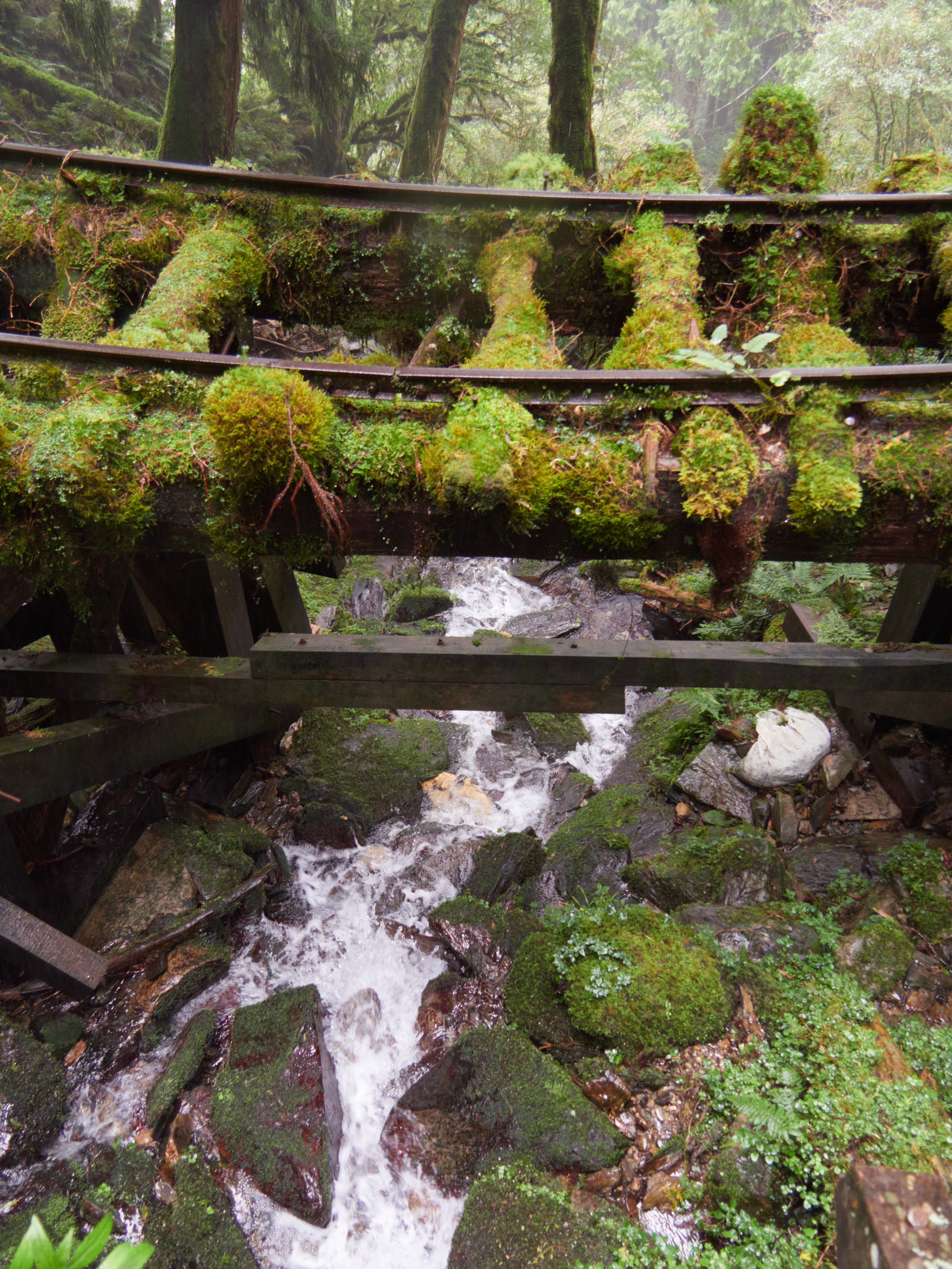
Abandoned moss-covered railway trestle bridge over a mountain stream at Jancing Historic Trail, Taipingshan.

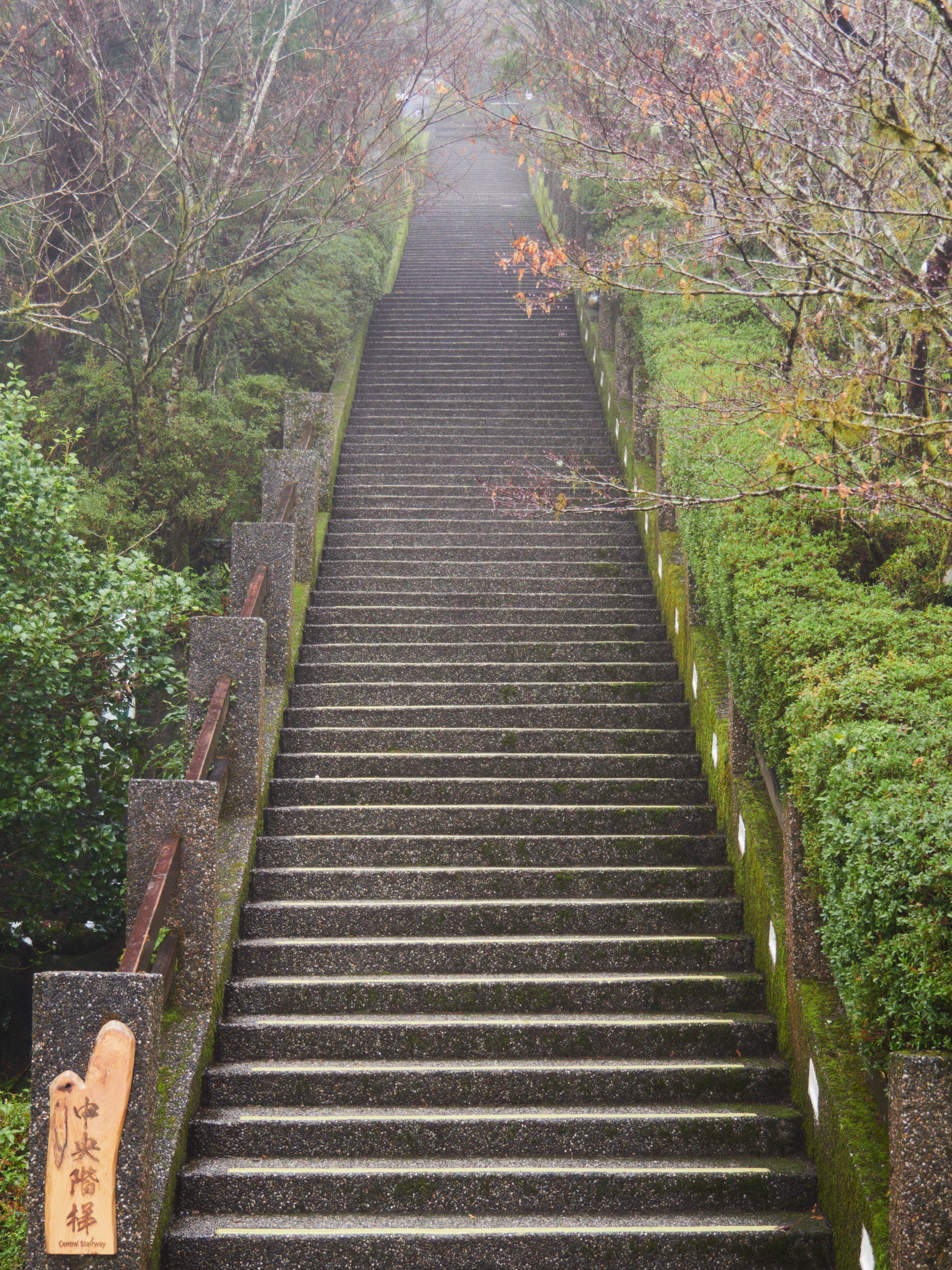
The Central Stairway at Taipingshan National Forest Recreation Area, in winter.

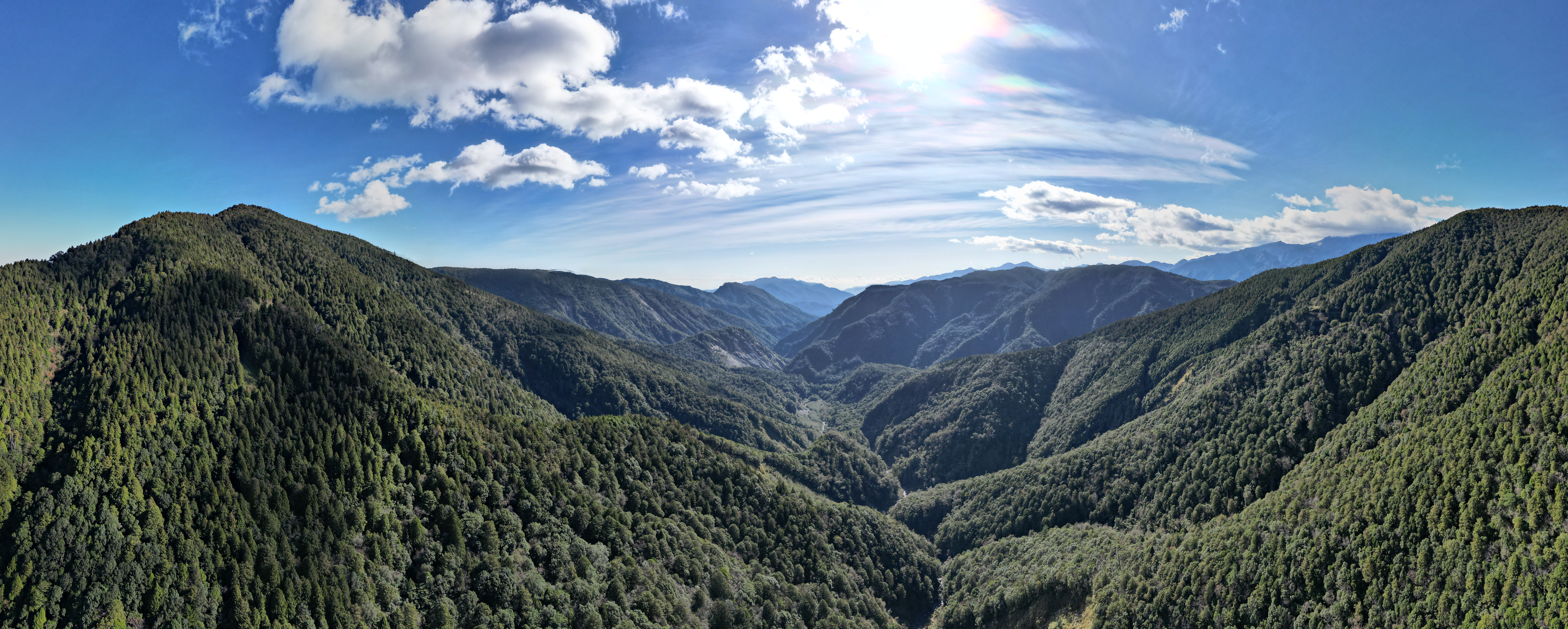
Aerial panorama of the view facing east from the top of Taiping Mountain. Shot December 2022.

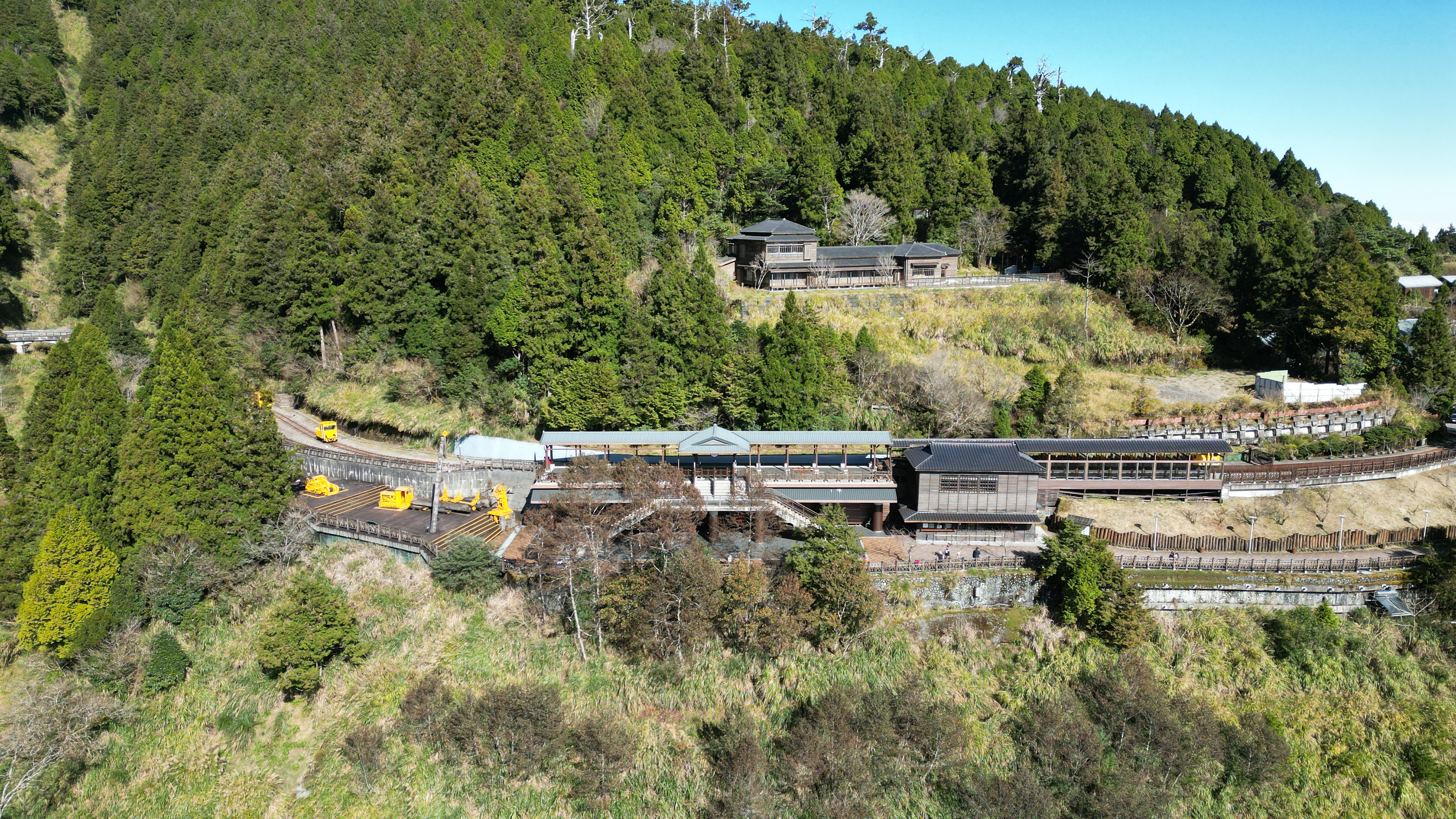
Taiping Mountain's Forest Railway Station. Shot December 2022.

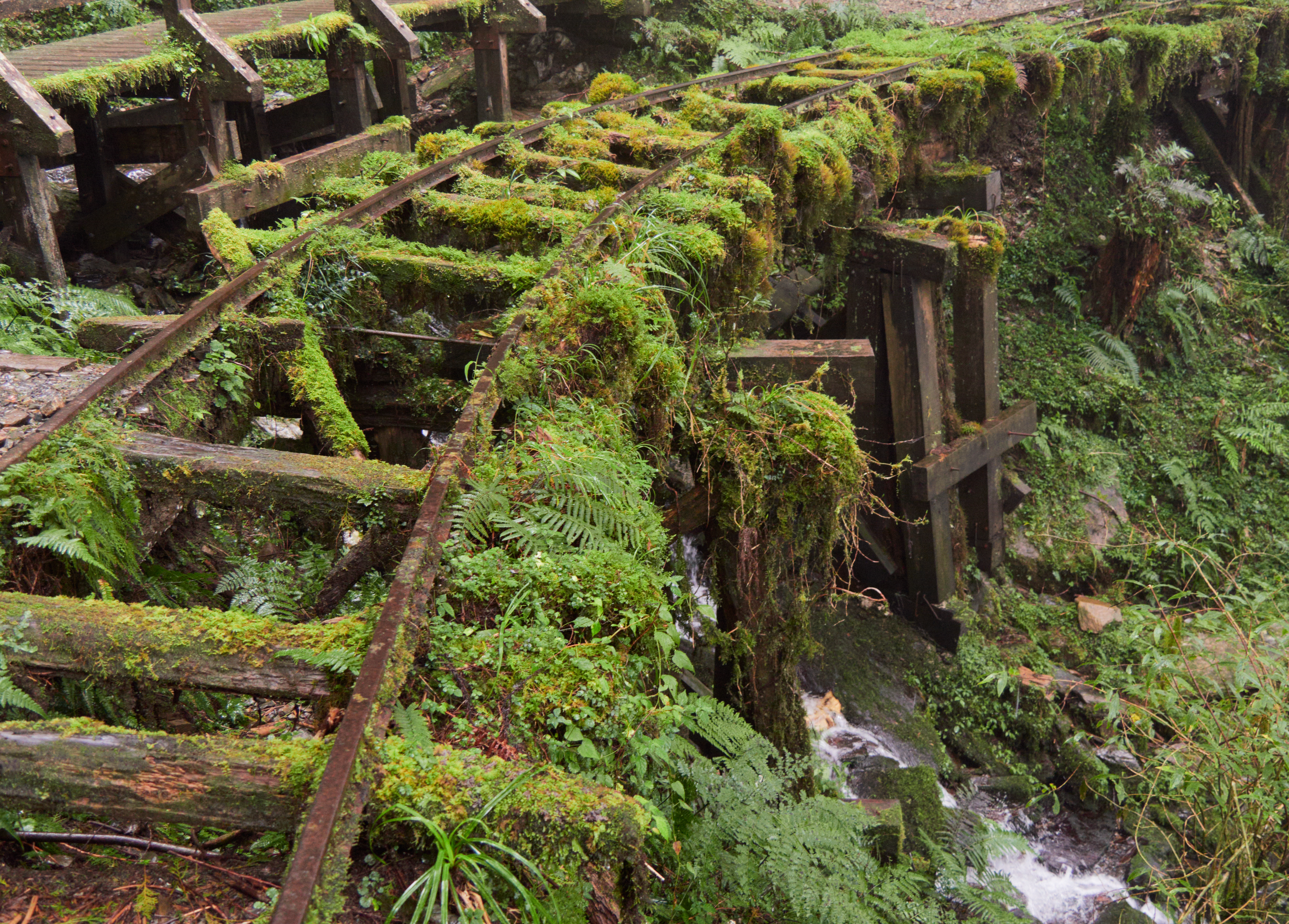
Jancing Historic Trail, Taipingshan.

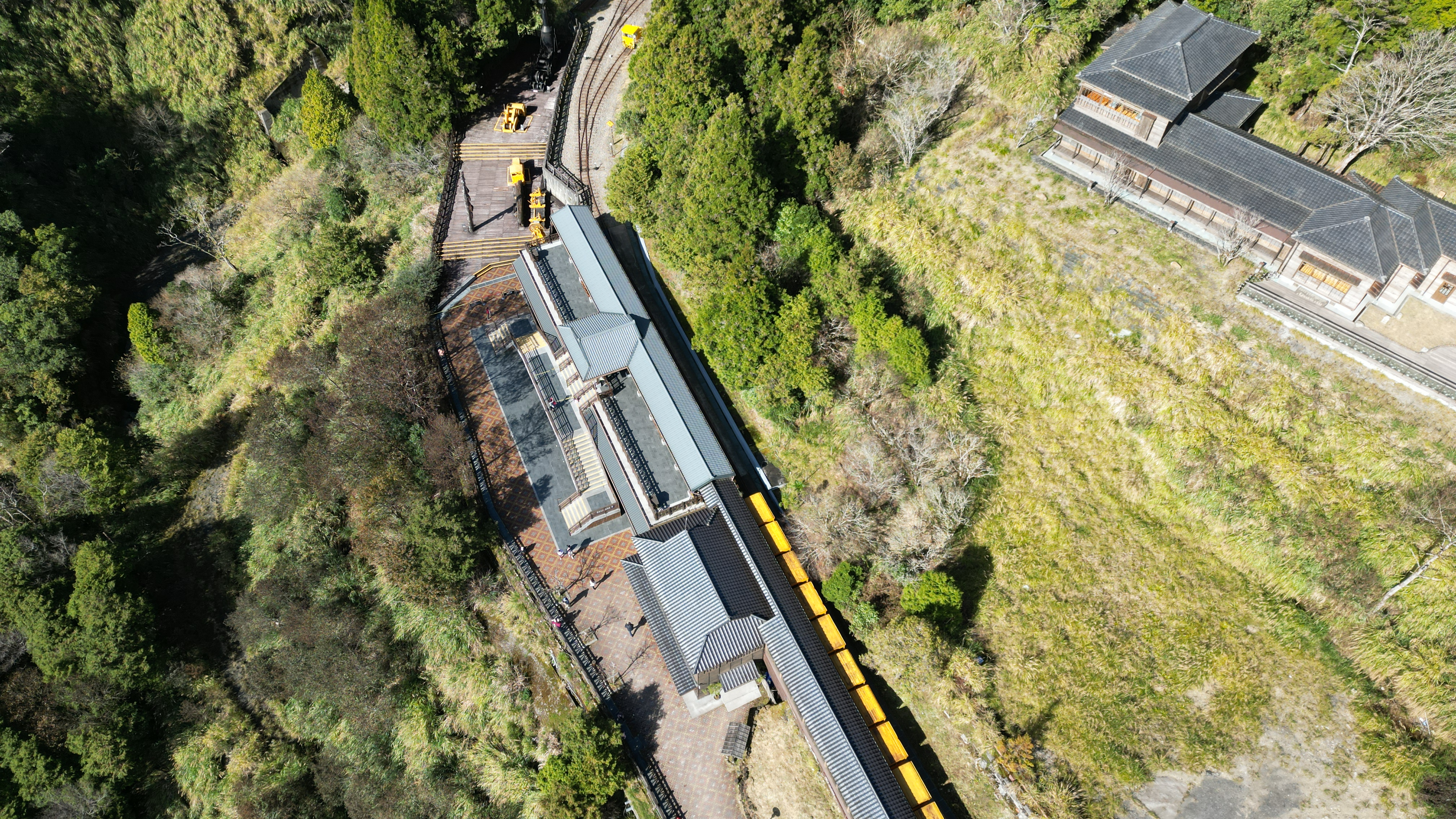
Topdown shot of Taiping Mountain's Forest Railway Station. Shot December 2022.

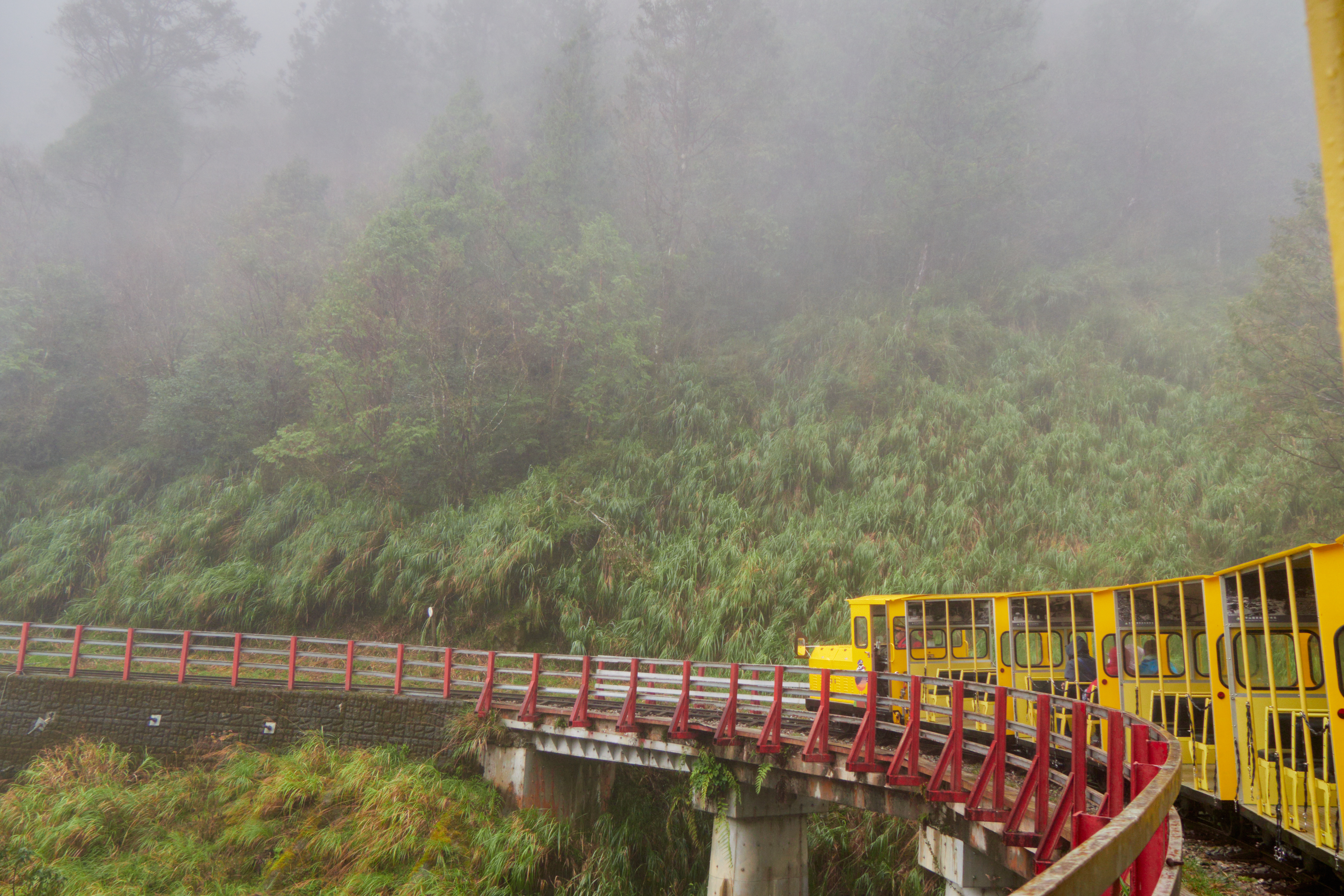
A narrow-gauge forest railway train crosses a curved bridge at Taipingshan National Forest Recreation Area.

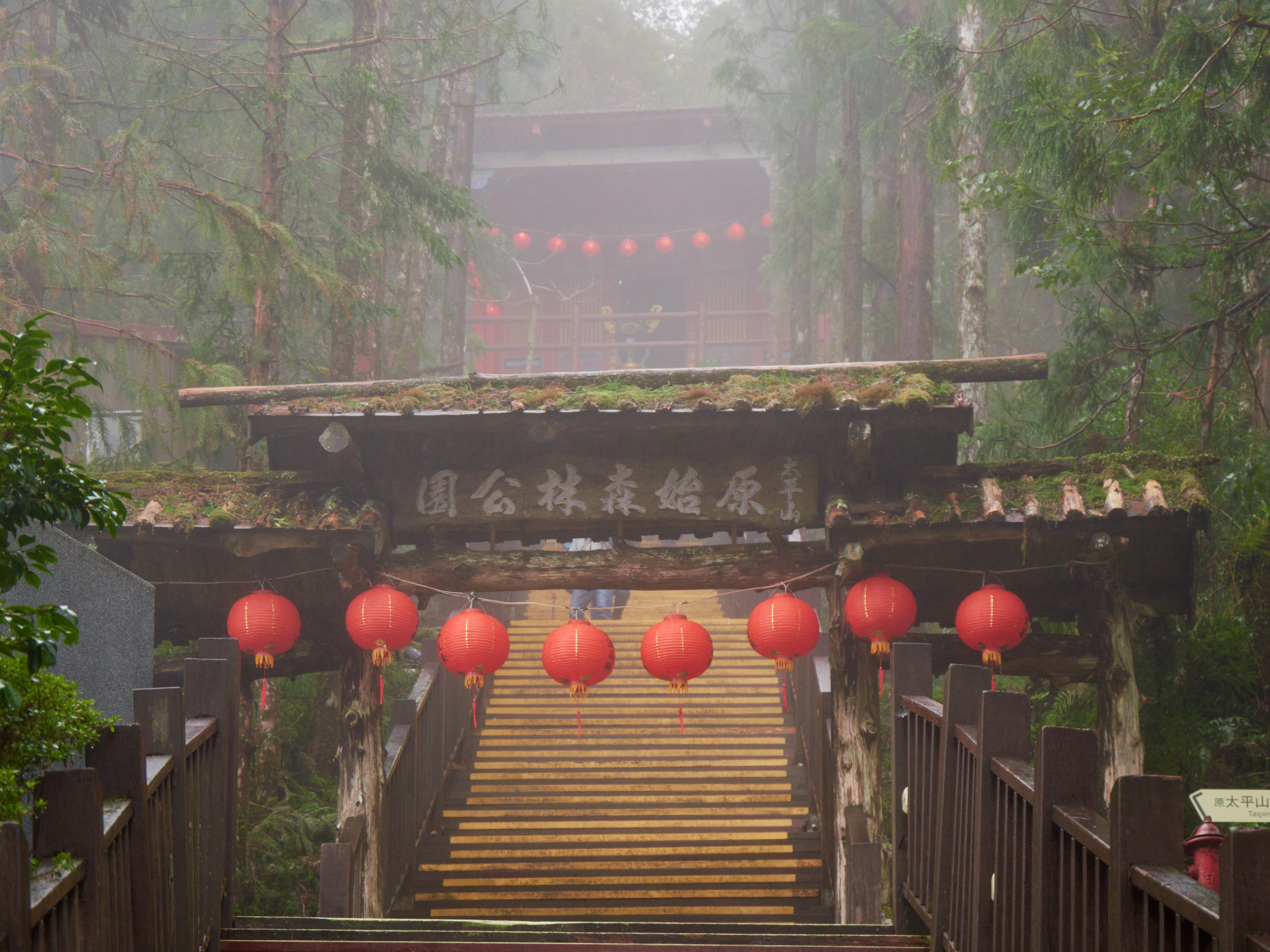
Zhen'an Temple

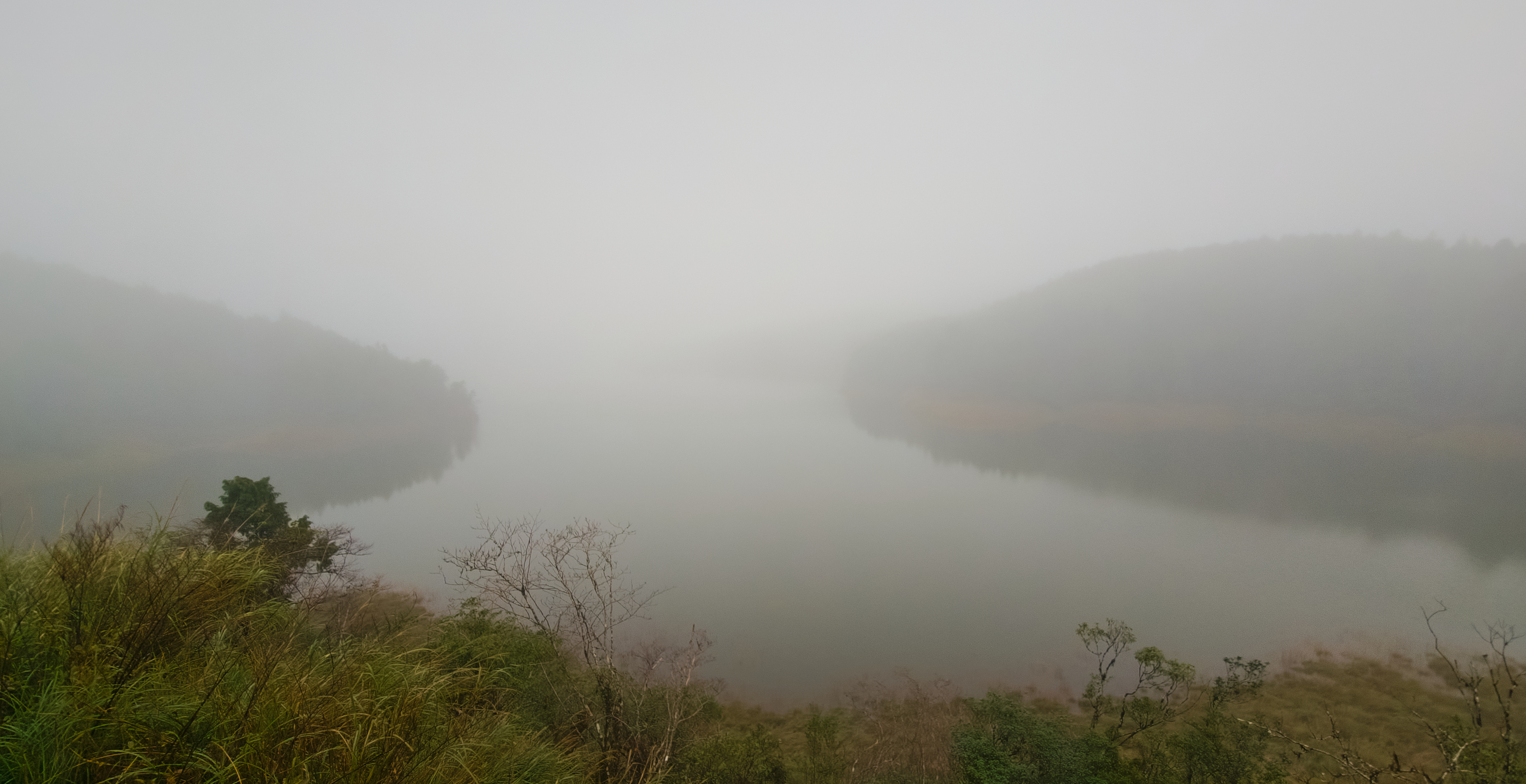
Cuifeng Lake, Taipingshan

== Climate ==
Climate data for Taipingshan, elevation 1,942 m (6,371 ft), (2019–2023, extremes 2000–present)
Month	Jan	Feb	Mar	Apr	May	Jun	Jul	Aug	Sep	Oct	Nov	Dec	Year
Record high °C (°F)	22.6 (72.7)	24.3 (75.7)	29.4 (84.9)	28.9 (84.0)	28.4 (83.1)	30.6 (87.1)	30.3 (86.5)	28.5 (83.3)	28.6 (83.5)	27.7 (81.9)	25.2 (77.4)	23.2 (73.8)	30.6 (87.1)
Mean daily maximum °C (°F)	10.3 (50.5)	12.5 (54.5)	15.9 (60.6)	17.1 (62.8)	19.1 (66.4)	21.3 (70.3)	22.2 (72.0)	21.4 (70.5)	20.2 (68.4)	15.7 (60.3)	14.7 (58.5)	10.9 (51.6)	16.8 (62.2)
Daily mean °C (°F)	6.2 (43.2)	7.7 (45.9)	10.4 (50.7)	12.2 (54.0)	15.0 (59.0)	17.1 (62.8)	17.8 (64.0)	17.3 (63.1)	15.9 (60.6)	13.0 (55.4)	11.1 (52.0)	7.2 (45.0)	12.6 (54.6)
Mean daily minimum °C (°F)	3.9 (39.0)	4.7 (40.5)	7.0 (44.6)	9.2 (48.6)	12.7 (54.9)	14.8 (58.6)	15.4 (59.7)	15.1 (59.2)	13.3 (55.9)	10.7 (51.3)	8.7 (47.7)	4.9 (40.8)	10.0 (50.1)
Record low °C (°F)	−9.4 (15.1)	−5.1 (22.8)	−4.4 (24.1)	−2.7 (27.1)	6.7 (44.1)	8.0 (46.4)	12.0 (53.6)	10.5 (50.9)	7.3 (45.1)	0.5 (32.9)	−4.5 (23.9)	−6.2 (20.8)	−9.4 (15.1)
Average precipitation mm (inches)	126.0 (4.96)	127.3 (5.01)	106.2 (4.18)	112.7 (4.44)	266.3 (10.48)	374.2 (14.73)	535.7 (21.09)	650.4 (25.61)	727.0 (28.62)	541.3 (21.31)	238.9 (9.41)	200.9 (7.91)	4,006.9 (157.75)
Average precipitation days	21.7	18.8	17.5	18.2	21.5	21.3	18.8	20.7	21.8	24.7	22.0	22.6	249.6
Average relative humidity (%)	93.8	91.9	89.9	91.0	94.0	94.4	92.9	93.8	92.9	95.9	94.3	93.3	93.2
Source 1: Central Weather Administration
Source 2: Atmospheric Science Research and Application Databank (precipitation 1996–2023, precipitation days and humidity 2000–2023)

== See also ==
- List of mountains in Taiwan
