= Datong, Yilan =

Mountain indigenous township in Yilan County, Taiwan

Coordinates: 24°40′37.8″N 121°36′32.5″E

Datong Township 大同鄉
- Mountain indigenous township
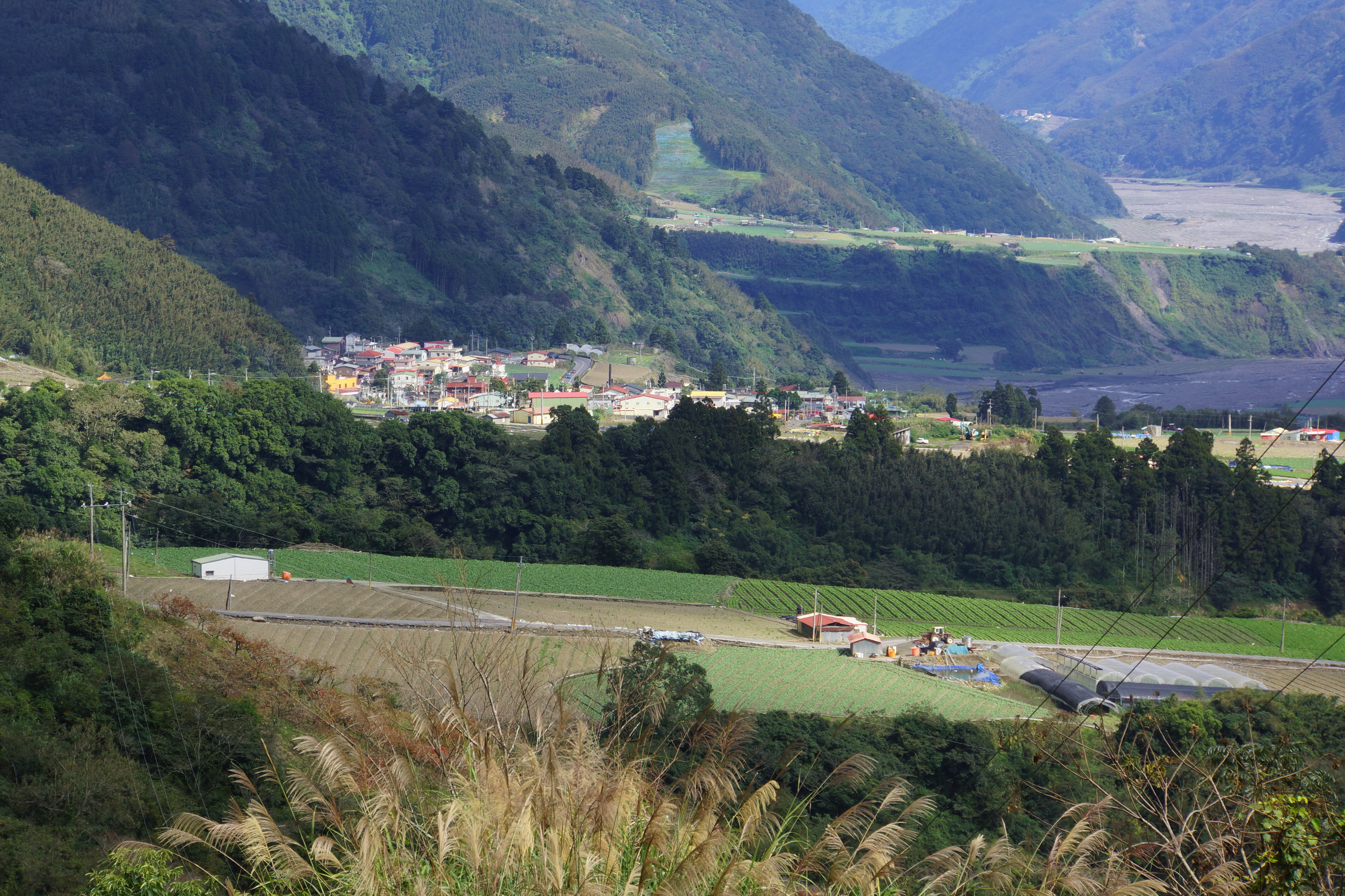
- Nanshan Village in Datong Township

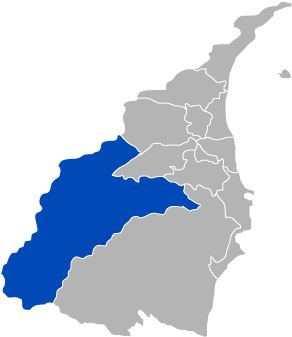
- Datong Township in Yilan County
- Location: Yilan County, Taiwan

Area
  - Land: 657.54 km^{2} (253.88 sq mi)

Population (September 2023)
  - Total: 6,042
  - Density: 9.189/km^{2} (23.80/sq mi)
- Website: www.datong.e-land.gov.tw/Default.aspx

Datong Township (Chinese: 大同鄉; pinyin: Dàtóng Xiāng; Wade–Giles: Da^{4}-t'ung^{2} Hsiang^{1}) is a mountain indigenous township in the southwestern part of Yilan County, Taiwan. It is the second largest township in Yilan County after Nan'ao Township.

== Geography ==
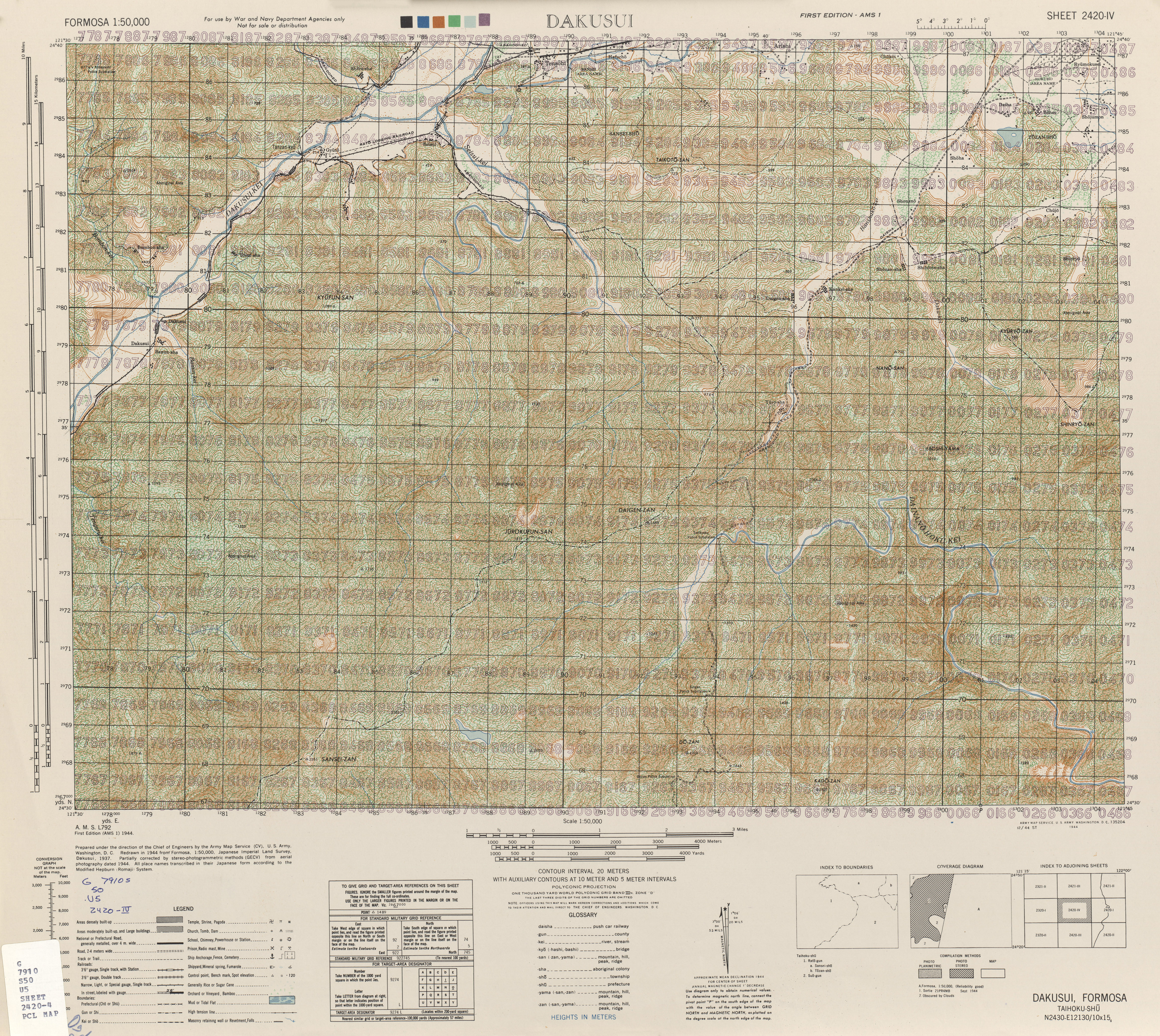
Map of Datong area (north) (1944)

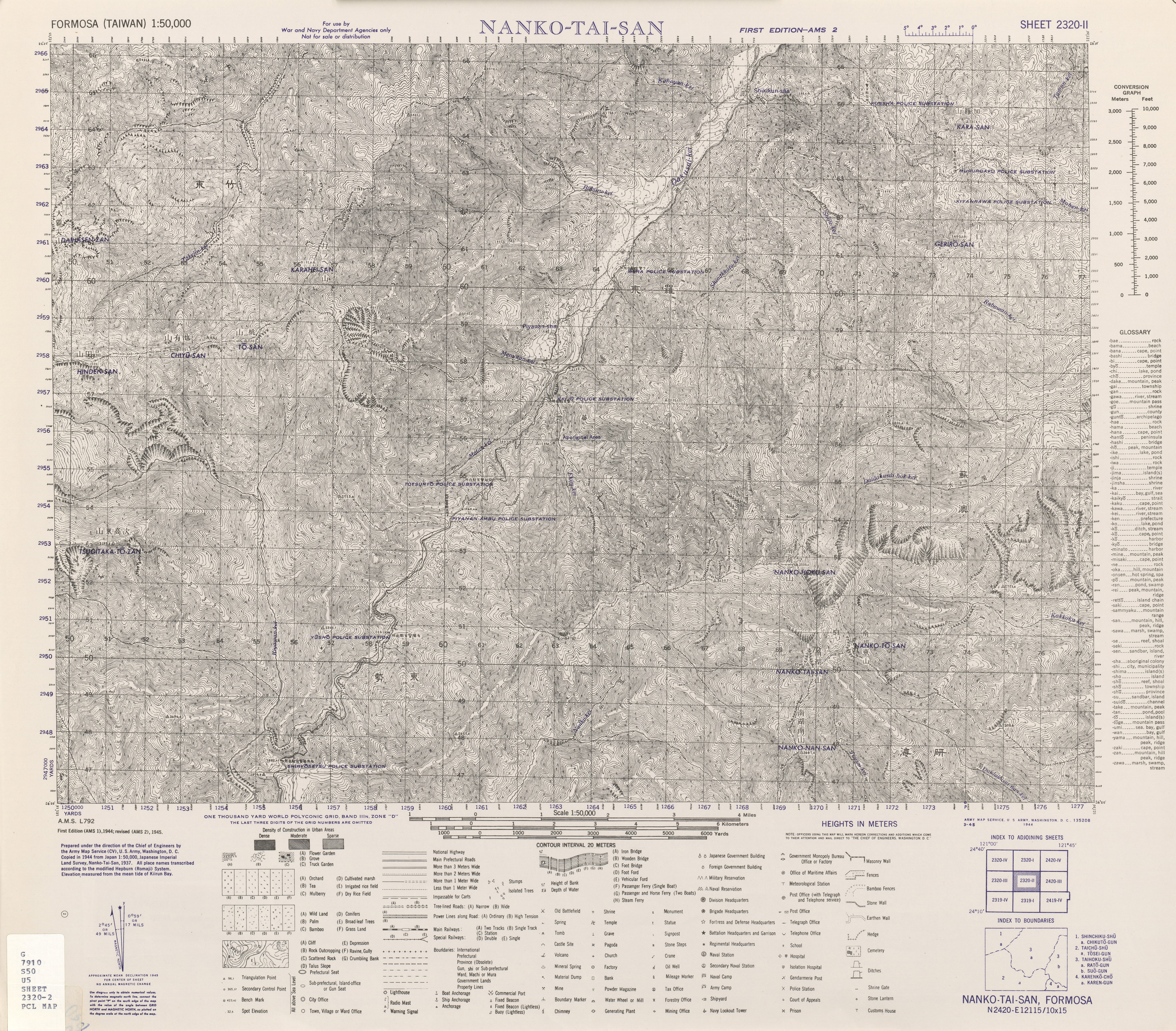
Map of Datong area (south) (1944)

It is predominantly populated by Taiwanese aborigines of the Atayal Tribe. The township is dominated by rugged mountains and wide river valleys. Most settlements in the county are located along the Lanyang River valley which runs from the central mountains of Taiwan into the Lanyang Plain.

- Area: 657.54 km^{2}
- Population: 6,042 people (September 2023)

== Administration ==
The villages of Datong include Daping, Fuxing, Hanxi, Leshui, Lunpi, Mao'an, Nanshan, Siji, Songluo and Yingshi. It was formerly the "Aboriginal Area" of Ratō District, Taihoku Prefecture during Japanese rule.

== Economy ==
Economic activities include trucking silt from the Lanyang River for use in cement production and cultivation of tea, cabbage and betel nut palms.

== Infrastructure ==
- Qingshui Geothermal Power Plant

== Tourist attractions ==
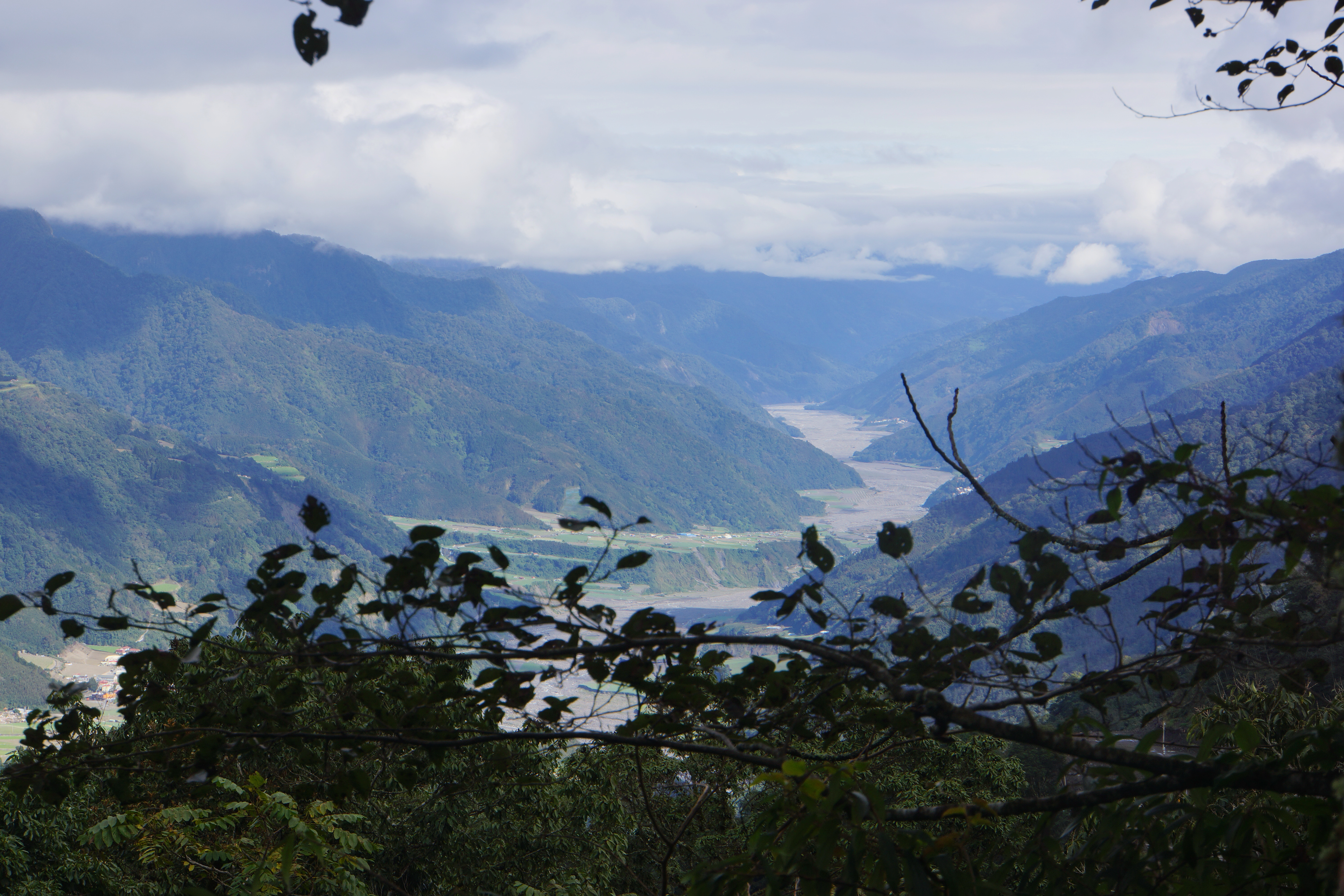
Lanyang River Valley in Datong Township

- Atayal Life Museum
- Cingshuei's Geothermal Square (清水地熱廣場)
- Hatonozawa Hot Spring (鳩之澤溫泉)
- Jiuliao River Ecological Park
- Lanyang River
- Mingchi National Forest Recreation Area
- Mount Taiping
- Qilan Forest Recreation Area
- Songluo National Trail
- Taipingshan Scenic Recreation Area
- Yulan Tea Cultivation Area
