= Butanawai =

Atayal mythological creature

Butanawai (Atayal language: Butanawai/Putauatsui) is an ancestor in Atayal mythology in Taiwan. He became rainbow after his death.

== Mythology ==
In ancient days, there was a hero called Butanawai, who treated his tribe fairly, and the people of his tribe saw him as god. When he was dying, he told his tribe that he would become the Red spirit, and he would appear with Sessappo, the Blue spirit, in the sky, guarding the descendants. If there is a sound appearing with the rainbow, that is the call from Butanawai.

== See also ==
- Atayal people
