= Tapung Old Fort =

Former fort in Jianshi, Hsinchu County, Taiwan

- 李崠古堡
- Jianshi, Hsinchu County, Taiwan
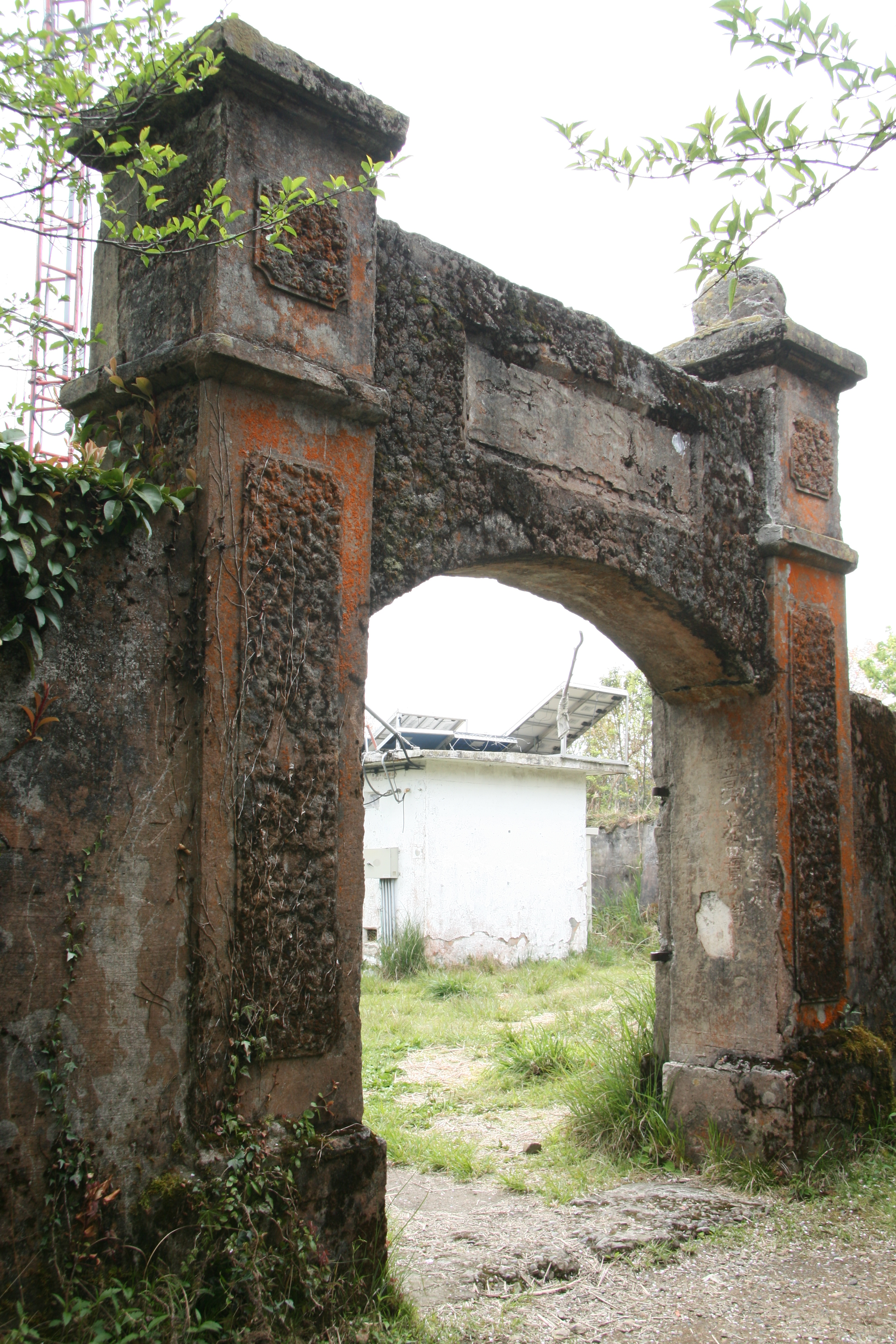

Site information
- Type: fort

Location
- Coordinates: 24°41′34.4″N 121°18′12.2″E

Site history
- Built: 1912

The Tapung Old Fort or Mount Lidong Fort (Chinese: 李崠古堡; pinyin: Lǐdōng Gǔbǎo) is a former fort in Jianshi Township, Hsinchu County, Taiwan.

== History ==
After the end of First Sino-Japanese War and the signing of Treaty of Shimonoseki in 1895, the Japanese soldiers quickly spread across Taiwan. Revolts happened in remote mountain areas with the local people. Sakuma Samata was named the Governor-General of Taiwan on 11 April 1906. He immediately tried to teach the aborigine Atayal people to follow the government. He began a five-year campaign during which he attacked the aborigines. In 1911, the Japanese army took over Mount Lidong after a heavy war which resulted huge casualties from both sides. The fort was then built in 1912 to protect themselves from the aborigines. Later in that year, two Atayal tribes united to fight the Japanese attacked the fort during a typhoon. The fort was defeated and a year later the Japanese counter-attacked the tribes. The Japanese then later rebuilt and reinforced the fort.

== Architecture ==
The fort was built on top of Mount Lidong in a quadrangle shape with 8 meters in length and 6 meters in width. It has bastions on the eastern and western sides of the fort as defense measure. The four walls surrounding the fort has 31 loopholes. The walls were made from armored-concrete and clay and the interior side has buttress pillar to further reinforce the structure.

== See also ==
- List of tourist attractions in Taiwan
