= Wulai Old Street =

Street in Wulai, New Taipei, Taiwan

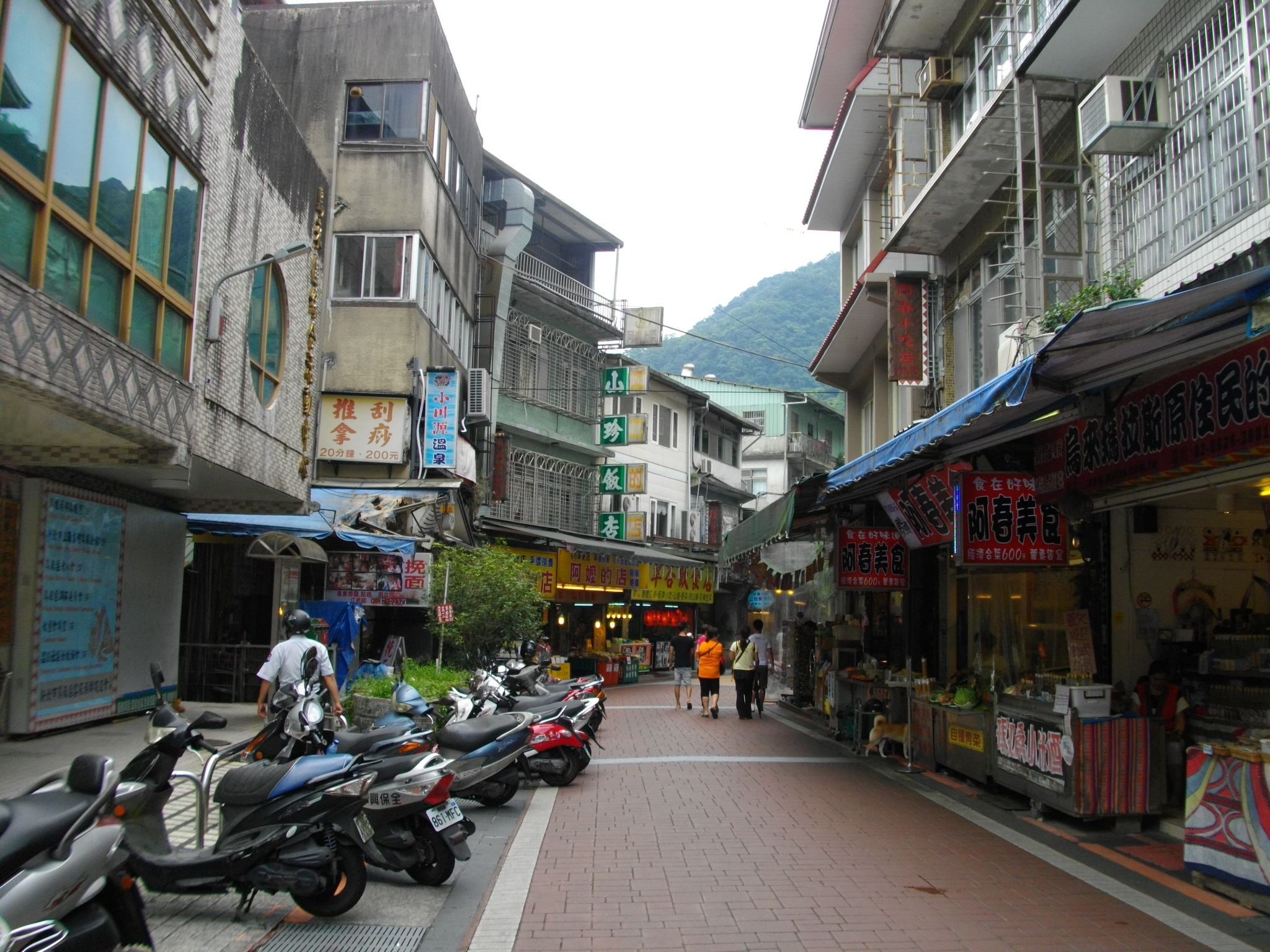

- Location within Taiwan
- Native name: 烏來老街 (Chinese)
- Type: street
- Length: 300 m (980 ft)
- Location: Wulai, New Taipei, Taiwan
- Coordinates: 24°51′49.5″N 121°33′05.1″E

The Wulai Old Street (traditional Chinese: 烏來老街; simplified Chinese: 乌来老街; pinyin: Wūlái Lǎojiē) is a street in Wulai District, New Taipei, Taiwan.

== Architecture ==
The street is a shopping district located along Huanshan Road and Pubu Road. It is located at Atayal aboriginal village filled with many food stalls and restaurants. It stretches for 300 meters.

== Tourist attractions ==
- Wulai Atayal Museum

== See also ==
- List of roads in Taiwan
- List of tourist attractions in Taiwan
