= Atayal Resort =

Resort in Ren'ai, Nantou County, Taiwan

- 泰雅渡假村
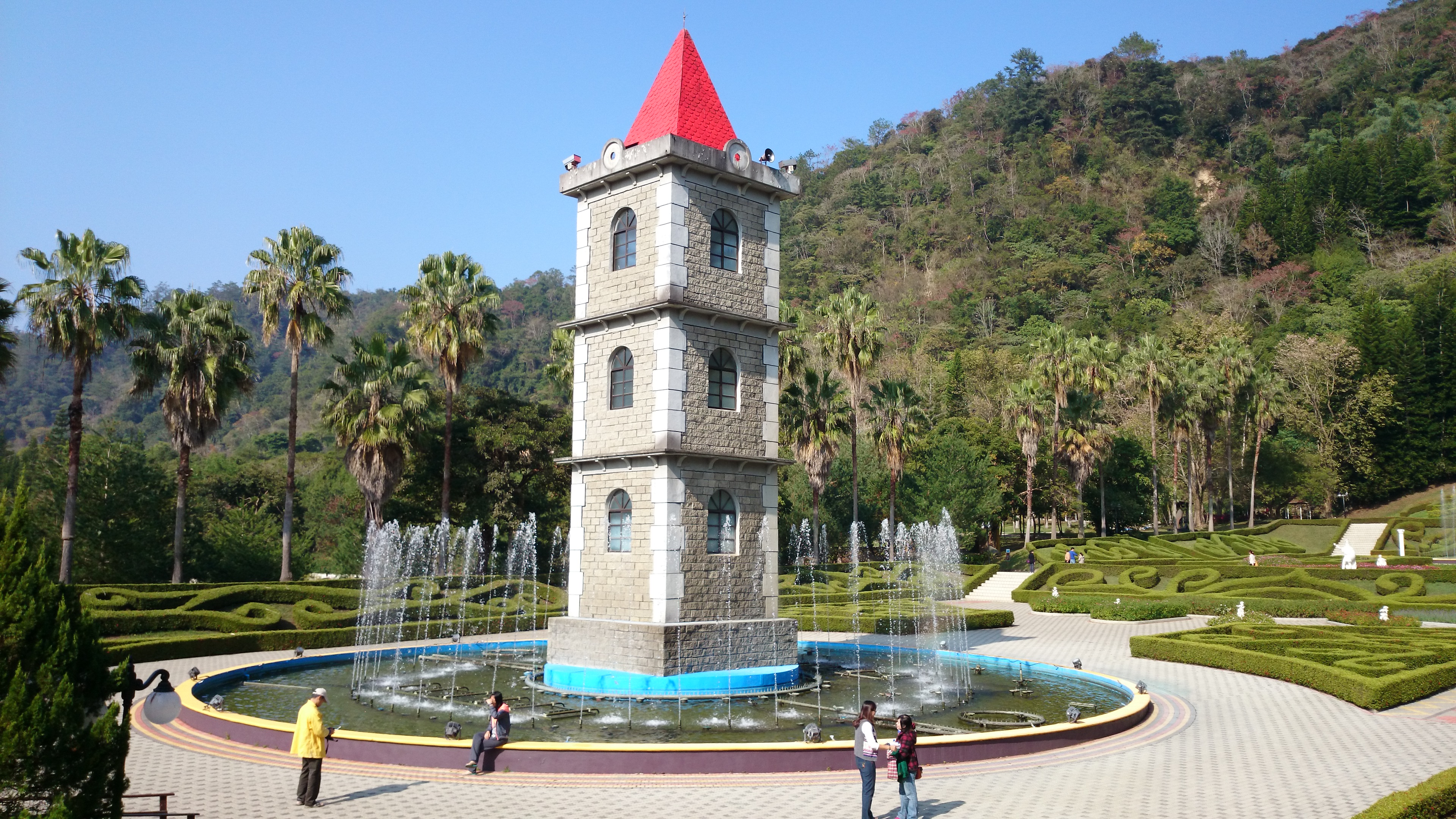
- Interactive map of the Atayal Resort area

General information
- Type: resort
- Location: Ren'ai, Nantou County, Taiwan
- Coordinates: 24°04′N 120°56′E
- Construction started: 1987
- Opened: 1992

Technical details
- Floor area: 47 hectares

Website
- Official website

The Atayal Resort (Chinese: 泰雅渡假村; pinyin: Tàiyǎ Dùjiàcūn) is a resort in Huzhu Village, Ren'ai Township, Nantou County, Taiwan.

== History ==
The resort was established by one of the survivor of Musha Incident. The construction of the resort started in 1987 and opened to the public in 1992.

== Architecture ==
The theme of the 47-hectare resort is about the Atayal people. It consists of the Atayal European Style Garden, Atayal Palace and Atayal Hot and Cold Spring.

== Transportation ==
The resort is accessible by bus or taxi from Taichung Station of the Taiwan High Speed Rail.

== See also ==
- List of tourist attractions in Taiwan
- Wulai Atayal Museum
