= Huozhong =

Huozhong 惑众
- Huozhong cover

Studio album by Guntzepaula
- Released: 27 June 2014
- Genre: alternative rock
- Length: 43:35
- Language: English, Taiwanese Mandarin
- Label: Click Music

Huozhong (惑众) meaning "Tricks", is the debut album from Guntzepaula. It was released on 27 Jun 2014 in Taiwan.

== Track List ==
No.	Title	Lyrics	Music	Length	
01	Huozhong		Guntzepaula /Yen Kay	02:11	Instrumental
02	Dig	Tze	Guntzepaula	04:15	Taiwanese
03	Magic Man	Tze	Guntzepaula	03:39	English
04	Stan	Tze / Anna Liao	Guntzepaula	05:39	English
05	Last Train	Tze	Guntzepaula	03:23	Taiwanese
06	Fallin	Tze	Guntzepaula	06:31	Taiwanese
07	Dr. Chen	Tze / Anna Liao	Guntzepaula	05:32	English
08	Victoria	Tze	Guntzepaula	04:50	Taiwanese
09	War	Tze	Guntzepaula	07:33	Taiwanese

== Awards ==
- 2014 Golden Indie Music Awards - Best Rock Album - HUOZHONG
- 2014 Golden Indie Music Awards - Best Musician of the Year (Bass - Tze)
