= Atayal language =

Austronesian language spoken in Taiwan

Atayal
- Tayal
- Region: Northern Taiwan
- Ethnicity: Atayal
- Native speakers: 86,000 (2008)
- Language family: Austronesian: Atayalic; Atayal
- Dialects: Matuʼuwal; Skikun; Squliq; Plngawan; Klesan; Sʼuli; Matuʼaw
- Writing system: Latin (Atayal alphabet)

Language codes
- ISO 639-3: tay
- Glottolog: atay1247
- Linguasphere: 30-AAA
- A map showing the distribution of the two major dialect groups of the Atayal language. The Atayal people reside in central and northern Taiwan, along the Hsuehshan mountains.

- Atayal is classified as Vulnerable by the UNESCO Atlas of the World's Languages in Danger.

The Atayal language is an Austronesian language spoken by the Atayal people of Taiwan. Squliq and Cʼuliʼ (Tsʼoleʼ) are two major dialects. Matuʼuwal and Paʼkualiʼ, two subdialects of Cʼuliʼ, are unique among Atayal dialects in having male and female register distinctions in their vocabulary.

== History ==
Several works on the language, including several reference grammars, have been published. In 1980 an Atayal–English dictionary was published by Søren Egerod. A translation of the Bible into Atayal was completed in 2003. Atayal was one of the source languages of Yilan Creole Japanese.

Under KMT rule, Taiwan saw the imposition of Mandarin Chinese as the sole national language, resulting in the suppression of indigenous languages, including Atayal. The education system mandated Mandarin instruction, leading to a decline in the intergenerational transmission of Atayal. Despite these challenges, Atayal communities maintained their language in private and informal settings. Following the lifting of martial law in the 1980s and Taiwan's subsequent democratization, policies shifted to recognize and preserve indigenous languages with the establishment of the Council of Indigenous Peoples.

In April 2020, an Atayal language Wikipedia was launched following efforts by Taiwan's Ministry of Education and National Chengchi University to promote the written use of Taiwan's Aboriginal languages.

== Dialects ==
Atayal dialects can be classified under two dialects groups: Squliq and Cʼuliʼ (Tsʼoleʼ).

There are 7 Atayal dialects according to Goderich (2020).

- Squliq is the prestige dialect, and the most widespread.
- Sʼuli (澤敖利泰雅語) is spoken in Hsinchu County (including in both Jianshi 尖石鄉 and Wufeng 五峰鄉 Townships), and also along the Da'an River (大安溪) between Miaoli County and Taichung City
- The Klesan (or Cʼuliʼ; 宜蘭澤敖利) historically lived around Mount Nanhu (南湖大山), but were relocated by the Japanese during the early 1900s. Currently, spoken about 40 km north and east of Mount Nanhu, in the villages of Pyahaw (碧候), Ropoy (金岳), Ləlaŋan/Buta (武塔), Iyu (東澳), and Kəŋyan (金洋).
- Matuʼuwal (or Mayrinax; 汶水泰雅語) is spoken in three villages along the Rinax River (汶水溪) in Tai'an Township (泰安鄉), Miaoli County, including in Qing'an Village (清安村) and Jinshui Village (錦水村).
- Plngawan (萬大泰雅語) is spoken in Sasi tribal village (親愛部落) in Ren'ai Township, Nantou County. Merged from three villages during the 1900s by the Japanese after they were relocated.
- Skikun (四季泰雅語) is spoken in at least two villages, Skikun tribal village (四季部落) and Mnawyan tribal village (碼崙部落), in Datong Township, Yilan County.
- Matuʼaw (Matabalay in Li 1981) is spoken in Maymaralas (南灣) and Matabalay (榮安) villages in Daxing Administrative Village (大興村), Tai'an (泰安鄉), Miaoli County.

Goderich (2020:193) classifies the Atayal dialects as follows, and also reconstructs over 1,000 words for Proto-Atayal.

- Atayal
  - Northern Atayal
    - Matuʼuwal
    - Nuclear Northern Atayal
      - Skikun
      - Squliq
  - Southern Atayal
    - Plngawan
    - Nuclear Southern Atayal
      - Klesan
      - Southwestern Atayal
        - Sʼuli
        - Matuʼaw

== Orthography ==
The Atayal language is most commonly written in the Latin script; a standard orthography for the language was established by the Taiwanese government in 2005. In writing, ⟨ng⟩ represents the velar nasal /ŋ/, and the apostrophe ⟨ʼ⟩ represents the glottal stop. In some literature, ⟨ḳ⟩ is used to represent /q/ and ⟨č š ž⟩ are used to represent /tʃ ʃ ʒ/.

In some dialects but not all, schwa /ə/ is frequently omitted in writing, resulting in long consonant clusters on the surface (e.g. pspngun /pəsəpəŋun/).

The pronunciation of certain letters differs from the IPA conventions. The letter ⟨b⟩ represents /β/, ⟨c⟩ is /ts/, ⟨g⟩ is /ɣ/, ⟨y⟩ is /j/, and ⟨z⟩ is /ʒ/.

== Phonology ==
Dialects differ slightly in their phonology.

=== Mayrinax Atayal ===
Presented below are the vowel and consonant inventories of Mayrinax Atayal (Huang 2000a). Orthographic conventions are added in ⟨angle brackets⟩.

==== Vowels ====
	Front	Central	Back
Close	i		u
Mid	e	ə	o
Open		a	

==== Consonants ====
		Bilabial	Alveolar	Palatal	Velar	Uvular	Laryngeal
Nasal		m	n		ŋ		
Plosive		p	t		k	q	ʔ
Affricate			ts ⟨c⟩				
Fricative	voiceless		s		x		ħ ⟨h⟩
Fricative	voiced	β			ɣ ⟨g⟩		
Liquid		w	r	j ⟨y⟩			

- /ʔ/ is glottal while /ħ/ is pharyngeal.

Most of these sounds are also encountered in other Formosan languages, but the velar fricative [x] is a trademark of Atayalic languages. This sound has restricted distribution, though, as it never occurs in word-initial position.

Even though some literature includes a glottal fricative in the consonant inventory, that phoneme is phonetically realized as a pharyngeal (Li 1980), which is true for Atayalic languages in general. The alveolar fricative (s) and affricate (ts) are palatalized before [i] and [j], rendering [ɕ] and [tɕ], respectively (Lu 2005), as in the Sinitic contact languages Mandarin Chinese and Taiwanese Hokkien.

=== Plngawan Atayal ===
Plngawan Atayal (a subdialect of Cʼuliʼ) differs from Mayrinax Atayal in lacking a schwa (ə), and in having two phonemic rhotics (Shih 2008).

=== Squliq Atayal ===
Presented below are the vowel and consonant inventories of Squliq Atayal (Huang 2018)

==== Vowels ====
	Front	Central	Back
Close	i		u
Mid	e		o
Open		a	

==== Consonants ====
		Bilabial	Alveolar	Palatal	Velar	Uvular	Glottal
Nasal		m	n		ŋ ⟨ng⟩		
Plosive		p	t		k	q	ʔ ⟨ʼ⟩
Affricate			ts ⟨c⟩				
Fricative	voiceless		s		x		h
Fricative	voiced	β	z		ɣ ⟨g⟩		
Approximant		w	l	j ⟨y⟩			
Trill			r				

Squliq Atayal has a voiced alveo-palatal fricative [z] (Li 1980), but Huang 2015 doubts its phonemicity, arguing that it is an allophone of [j].

== Grammar ==
=== Verbs ===
Mayrinax Atayal (a Cʼuliʼ dialect spoken in Tai'an Township, Miaoli County) has a four-way focus system (Huang 2000b).

1. Agent focus (AF)
2. Patient focus (PF)
3. Locative focus (LF)
4. Instrumental/Beneficiary focus (IF/BF)

The following list of focus markers are used in Mayrinax Atayal.

- Agent focus (AF)
  - Realis: m-, -um- (more dynamic); ma-, ø (less dynamic / more stative)
  - Irrealis: m-, ma-, -um- ... -ay (projective/immediate); pa- (future)
- Patient focus (PF)
  - Realis: -un (neutral), ø (perfective)
  - Irrealis: -aw (projective/immediate); -un (future)
- Locative focus (LF)
  - Realis: -an
  - Irrealis: -ay (projective/immediate); -an (future)
- Instrumental/Beneficiary focus (IF/BF)
  - Realis: si-
  - Irrealis: -anay (projective/immediate); ø (future)

Aspect markers include:

- -in-: perfective
- pa-: irrealis (also serves as a causative marker)
- kiaʔ and haniʔan: progressive

Other verbal markers include:

- ka-: stative marker
- i-: locative marker
- ø- (null marker): agent-focus imperative

Dynamic and stative verbal prefixes run along a continuum. Here, they are listed from most dynamic to most stative.

1. m-, -um-
2. ma_{1}-, ø_{1}
3. ma-_{2}
4. ø_{2}

=== Case markers ===
Mayrinax Atayal has an elaborate case marking system. The Mayrinax case markers below are sourced from Huang (2002).

Mayrinax Atayal Case Markers
Case		Nominative	Accusative	Genitive/ Oblique	Comitative
Proper noun		ʔiʔ	ʔiʔ	niʔ	kiʔ
Common noun	referential	kuʔ	ckuʔ	nkuʔ	–
Common noun	non-referential	aʔ	cuʔ	naʔ	–

Wulai Atayal (a Squliq Atayal dialect spoken in Wulai District, New Taipei City) has a much simpler case-marking system (Huang 1995).

Wulai Atayal Case Markers
Case	Nominative	Instrumental	Genitive	Comitative	Locative
Markers	quʔ	naʔ	naʔ, nquʔ	kiʔ	te, squʔ, sa

=== Pronouns ===
The Mayrinax and Wulai Atayal personal pronouns below are sourced from Huang (1995). In both varieties, the nominative and genitive forms are bound while the neutral and locative ones are free (unbound).

Wulai Atayal Personal Pronouns
Type of Pronoun	Nominative	Genitive	Locative	Neutral
1s.	sakuʔ, kuʔ	makuʔ, mu, kuʔ	knan	kuzing, kun
2s.	suʔ	suʔ	sunan	isuʔ
3s.	–	nyaʔ	hiyan	hiyaʔ
1p. (incl.)	taʔ	taʔ	itan	itaʔ
1p. (excl.)	sami	myan	sminan	sami
2p.	simu	mamu	smunan	simu
3p.	–	nhaʔ	hgan	hgaʔ

Mayrinax Atayal Personal Pronouns
Type of Pronoun	Nominative	Genitive	Neutral
1s.	cu, ciʔ	mu, miʔ	kuing
2s.	suʔ, siʔ	suʔ	isuʔ
3s.	–	niaʔ	hiyaʔ
1p. (incl.)	taʔ, tiʔ	taʔ, tiʔ	itaʔ
1p. (excl.)	cami	niam	cami
2p.	cimu	mamu	cimu
3p.	–	nhaʔ	nhaʔ

== Affixes ==
The following list of Mayrinax Atayal affixes is sourced from the Comparative Austronesian Dictionary (1995).

- Note: Some affixes are unglossed.

Verbal prefixes

- ma- 'stative'
- ma- 'active'
- man-
- mana-
- maɣ-
- ma-ša- 'reciprocal, mutual'
- ma-ši 'natural release or movement'
- pana-
- ma-ti-
- ʔi-
- pa- 'causative'
- ši- 'benefactive'
- ga- 'verbalizer'
- kan- + RED + N (body parts) 'body movement'
- ma-ka- 'mutual, reciprocal'
- maki- 'active verb'
- mat- 'to turn'
- mi-
- paš-
- ta- ... -an 'location'
- tiɣi- 'to release gas'
- tu- 'for some to ... '

Verbal infixes

- -um- 'agent focus'
- -in- 'completive'

Verbal suffixes

- -an 'locative focus'
- -un 'object focus'
- -i 'imperative'
- -aw 'future or mild request'
- -ani 'polite request'

Nominal affixes

- -in- 'nominalizer'
- -in- ... -an 'nominalizer to indicate a completed action'
- Male affixes (i.e., male forms of speech in Mayrinax Atayal) include (Comparative Austronesian Dictionary): -niḳ, -iḳ, -ʔiŋ, -hiŋ, -iŋ, -tiŋ, -riʔ, -ḳiʔ, -niʔ, -nux, -ux, -hu, -u, -al, -liʔ, -kaʔ, -ha, -il, -in-, -il-, -i-, -a-, -na-.

== See also ==
- Yilan Creole Japanese

== Bibliography ==
- Chen, Shu-chuan 陳淑娟 (2010). "Tàiyǎyǔ de yǔyán huólì yǔ yǔyán fù zhèn: Yǐ Sīmǎkùsī jí Zhúdōng wéi lì" 泰雅語的語言活力與語言復振─以司馬庫斯及竹東為例 [Language Vitality and Language Revitalization of the Atayal in Taiwan: The Cases of Smangus and Chutung] (PDF). Táiwān yǔwén yánjiū / Journal of Taiwanese Languages and Literature (in Chinese). 5 (1): 15–36.
- Egerod, Søren (1980). Atayal–English Dictionary. Curzon Press.
- Huang, Lillian M. (1995). "The Syntactic Structure of Wulai and Mayrinax Atayal: A Comparison". Bulletin of National Taiwan Normal University. 40: 261–294.
- Huang, Mei-chin 黃美金; Wu, Hsi-sheng 吳新生 (2018). Tàiyǎyǔ yǔfǎ gàilùn 泰雅語 語法概論 [Introduction to Atayal Grammar] (in Chinese). Xinbei Shi: Yuanzhuminzu weiyuanhui. ISBN 978-986-05-5683-4. Archived from the original on 2021-06-13 – via alilin.apc.gov.tw.
- Li, Paul Jen-kuei (1980). "The Phonological Rules of Atayal Dialects" (PDF). Bulletin of the Institute of History and Philology, Academia Sinica. 51 (2): 349–405.
- Rau, D. V. (1992). A Grammar of Atayal (Ph.D. thesis). Cornell University. – Describes Squliq Atayal.
- Shih, P. (2008). Interrogative Constructions in Plngawan Atayal (M.A. thesis). National Taiwan Normal University.
- Valle, G. d. (1963). Handbook of Atayal: As It Is Spoken in Wufeng (Hsinchu Hsien). Taichung: Kuangchi Press.

Mayrinax Atayal

- Huang, Lillian (2000a). Tàiyǎyǔ cānkǎo yǔfǎ 泰雅語參考語法 [Atayal Language Reference Grammar] (in Chinese). Taipei: Yuanliou. – Describes Mayrinax Atayal
- Huang, Lillian M. (2000b). "Verb Classification in Mayrinax Atayal". Oceanic Linguistics. 39 (2): 364–390. doi:10.2307/3623428. JSTOR 3623428.
- Huang, Lillian M. (2001). "Focus System of Mayrinax Atayal: A Syntactic, Semantic and Pragmatic Perspective". Journal of Taiwan Normal University: Humanities & Social Science. 46 (1&2): 51–69. doi:10.6210/JNTNULL.2001.46.04.
- Huang, Lillian M. (2002). "Nominalization in Mayrinax Atayal" (PDF). Language and Linguistics. 3 (2): 197–225. Archived from the original (PDF) on 2021-06-10.
- Lu, Anne Yu-an (2005a). "Order and Interaction of Prefixes in Mayrinax Atayal" (PDF). UST Working Papers in Linguistics. 1: 295–310. Archived from the original (PDF) on 2021-06-10.
- Lu, Anne Yu-an (2005b). Mayrinax Phonology: With Special Reference to UM Affixation (M.A. thesis). National Tsing Hua University.
