= Y2J (band) =

Taiwanese rock band

- Born: Taiwan
- Occupation: Singer
- Years active: 2008–present

Chinese name
- Traditional Chinese: 神木與瞳
- Simplified Chinese: 神木与瞳
Transcriptions
Standard Mandarin
- Hanyu Pinyin: Shén Mù Yǔ Tóng
- Musical career
- Origin: Taiwan
- Genres: Mandopop, Taiwanese Rock
- Labels: Universal Music Taiwan (2008–present)
- Members: Jane Huang; Yuming Lai
- Website: Umusic.com.tw

Y2J (traditional Chinese: 神木與瞳; simplified Chinese: 神木与瞳; pinyin: Shén Mù Yǔ Tóng) is a Taiwanese rock band composed of two participants (Yuming Lai and Jane Huang) from the 2007 season of One Million Star, a singing competition. The band released its debut album "Live For You" on 25 August 2008.

The two-member band's English name is derived Yuming Lai's first initial (Y), the number of band members (2), and Jane Huang's first initial (J). The band's Chinese name "Shenmu yu Tong", means "sacred tree and pupil (of the eye)". "Shénmù" (神木), meaning "sacred tree", comes from a large tree in Lai's village which shares the name "Yuming". "Little Tong" (瞳 tóng, "pupil")" is a nickname Jane Huang has had from childhood.

== Member history ==
Yuming Lai (Lai Ming Wei) (25 June 1984 -), was born in Taoyuan County (now Taoyuan City), Taiwan, to a mother of the Atayal indigenous tribe. He graduated from Yongfeng High School and the Grand Cathay Institute of Technology. In 2007, he decided to participate in the One Million Star Taiwanese singing competition. In January 2008, he was crowned champion of the competition.

Jane Huang (Huang Mei Zhen) (19 January 1983 -), was born in Taitung County, Taiwan. She is a member of Taiwan's Puyuma aboriginal people. In 2007, she finished seventh in the One Million Star Taiwanese singing competition, but her strength in the rock genre was clear. With the strong support of her fans, she became the popular vote winner.

In January 2008, the duo got their big break when they were signed to the Universal Music Taiwan record label. Since then, they have released a Chinese version of the song "We Rock" from the Disney Channel movie Camp Rock. In August 2008, their debut album was released in China, Taiwan, and other parts of East Asia, with music videos for the first single "Live For You" and several other songs.

== Discography ==
=== Studio albums ===
| Album title | Album Information |
|---|---|
| Live For You | Released: 25 August 2008; Language: Mandarin Chinese; Label: Universal Music Taiwan; Genre: Mandarin pop, Taiwanese rock |
| Guardian | Released: 11 June 2010; Language: Mandarin Chinese; Label: Universal Music Taiwan; Genre: Mandarin pop, Taiwanese rock |
