= Guntzepaula =

Taiwanese indie rock band

- Origin: Taipei, Taiwan
- Genres: Alternative rock, progressive rock, experimental rock, hard rock, jazz rock
- Years active: 2008–present
- Members: Tze-hao Haung (2008-present), Yen-chieh Lien (2008-present), Min-Yen Lee (2017-present)
- Past members: Pao-Lin Chen (2008-2017), Jimmy Lu (2008-2009)

Guntzepaula (In Mandarin : 槍擊潑辣) is a Taiwanese indie band formed in 2008, the band is currently composed of bassist/vocalist Black Tze (Tze-hao Haung 黃子豪), guitarist Agun (Yen-chieh Lien 連彥杰) and drummer Ming Yen (Ming-yen Lee 李旻諺). This power trio band is known for band members’ skillful performance, especially the bassist’s slap technique.

== Musical style ==
The music of Guntzepaula is experimental and progressive with harsher and dissonant sounds. Songs were written during jam sessions, most songs and lyrics are inspired with social and political issues, to explore the darkness in human relationships.

== Band History ==
=== Formation and early years (2008–2013) ===
After vocalist Black Tze and guitarist Agun’s funk rock band was disbanded in 2007, Black Tze disappeared for a year and discovered his talent in bass. They decided to form a funk fusion band in 2008 and started to find a new drummer. They chose Oz Noy’s “Just Groove Me” for drummer auditions, Paul was recruited. Few months later, saxophonist Jimmy Lu joined the band, they used a word from each member’s name to form the band name “Guntzepaulna”, which changed to “Guntzepaula” after Jimmy left the band.

=== Debut album - Huozhong (2014–2015) ===
Guntzepaula first performed at The Underworld live house in 2012, they got noticed and made it to The Next Big Thing indie band program by StreetVoice. The band also won the third place of Ho-hai-yan Rock Festival the same year.

Soon they started to write more songs and released their debut album “HUOZHONG” (HUO-ZHONG in Mandarin means to trick/confuse the crowd) in 2014. The album includes one instrumental song, three English songs and five Taiwanese Hokkien dialect songs. Songs from this album were inspired by stories from the news or undefined rumors. For example, the song “Dr. Chen” is about Chen Wen-chen’s unsolved death in 1981. This album was nominated in six categories of Golden Indie Music Award 2014, and won The Best Rock Band award and The Best Musician award (Black Tze).

The band was signed to Click Music in the same year, they toured with Trash in 2015, to thirteen cities including Hong Kong, Singapore, Beijing, Shanghai, Osaka, Tokyo then back to Taipei.

=== Black Lotus (2016–2018) ===
The second album Black Lotus was released in 2016 including seven Taiwanese Hokkien dialect songs and three instrumental songs, and was nominated in two categories of Golden Indie Music Award. Then Guntzepaula ended its contract with Click Music, and drummer Paul left the band due to personal plans.

New drummer Ming Yen joined the band in 2017, then they were invited to play at Wanagain Festival in France as the new drummer’s first show.

=== Escapism (2019–present) ===
Guntzepaula was signed to Output Music and released a digital EP “Escapism” in 2019, including three Taiwanese Hokkien dialect songs. The music video of “Since I Met You” was released on July 7, 2020, and it was directed and edited by the vocalist/bassist Black Tze as his directorial debut.

In 2021, the band wrote their first Mandarin song “Chess Saṃsāra” with rapper R-Flow, it was the theme song for oqliq’s 3D runway show in London Fashion Week 2021.

== Band members ==
Guntzepaula originally formed with bassist/vocal Black Tze, guitarist Agun, drummer Paul and saxophonist Jimmy Lu, soon the saxophonist left the band. Drummer Paul left the band in 2016 due to personal plans and Ming Yen joined in 2017.

=== Current members ===
- Tze-Hao Haung – lead vocals, bass (2008–present)
- Yen-Chieh Lien – guitar (2008–present)
- Min-Yen Lee – drums (2017-present)

=== Former members ===
- Pao-Lin Chen – drums (2008–2017)
- Jimmy Lu - alto-sax (2008-2009)

== Discography ==
Date	Title
June 26, 2014	Huozhong
June 1, 2016	Black Lotus
October 31, 2019	Escapism EP

== See also ==
- Taiwanese Rock
