= Jane Huang =

Taiwanese singer

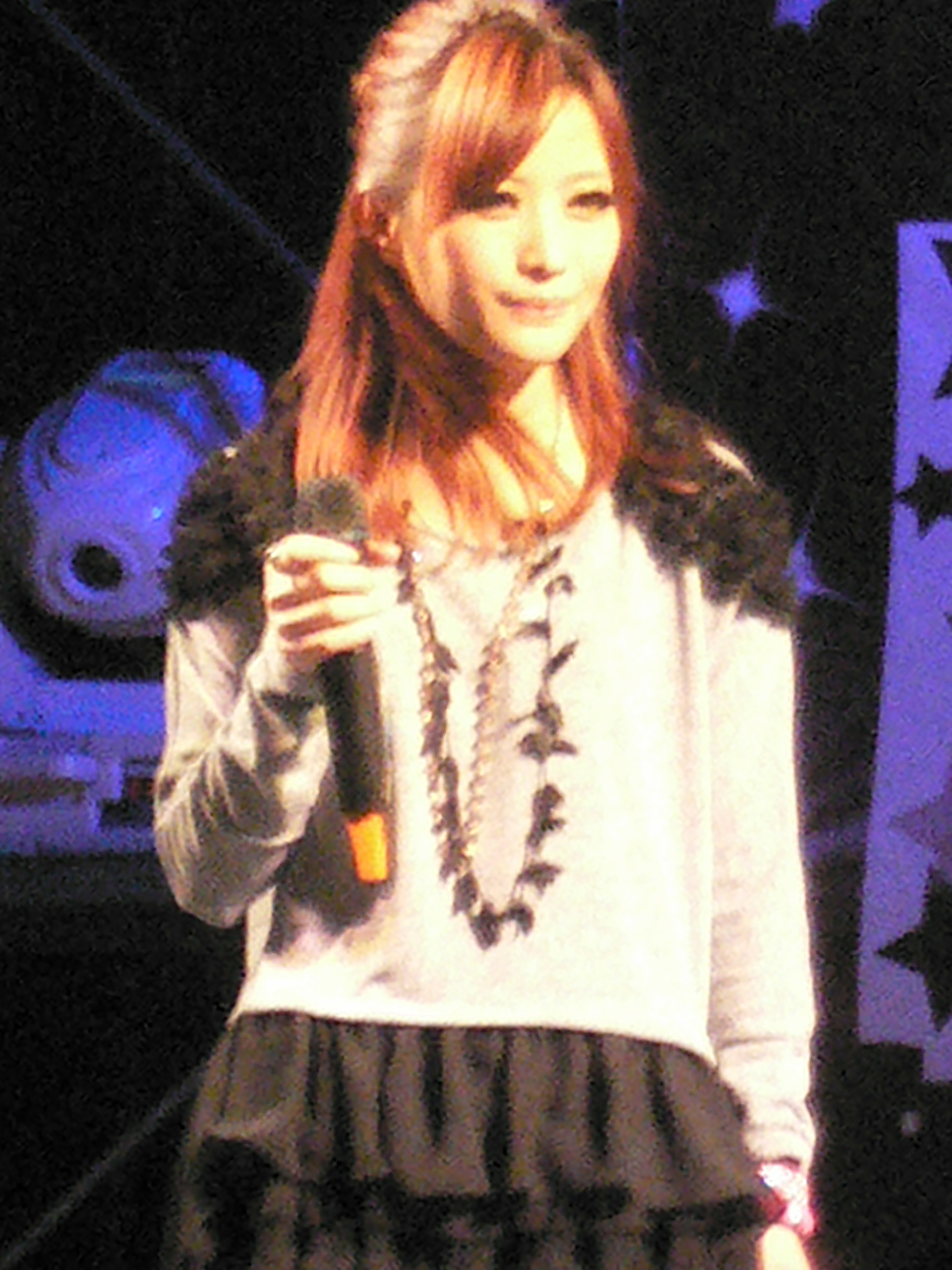
- Huang in 2010
- Born: 黃美珍; 19 January 1983 (age 43); Taitung County, Taiwan
- Occupation: Singer
- Years active: 2008–present

Chinese name
- Traditional Chinese: 黃美珍
Transcriptions
Standard Mandarin
- Hanyu Pinyin: Huang Meizhen
- Musical career
- Origin: Taiwan
- Genres: Mandarin Pop, Taiwanese Rock
- Label: Universal Music Taiwan

Jane Huang (Puyuma: Alines, Chinese: 黃美珍; pinyin: Huang Meizhen; born 19 January 1983) is a Taiwanese singer. She was born in Taitung County, Taiwan. She is a member of Taiwan's Puyuma aboriginal people. In 2007, she finished seventh in the One Million Star Taiwanese singing competition. With the strong support of her fans, she became the popular vote winner. She is currently in the band Y2J with band member Yuming Lai.
