= Wulai Atayal Museum =

Museum in Wulai, New Taipei, Taiwan

- 烏來泰雅民族博物館
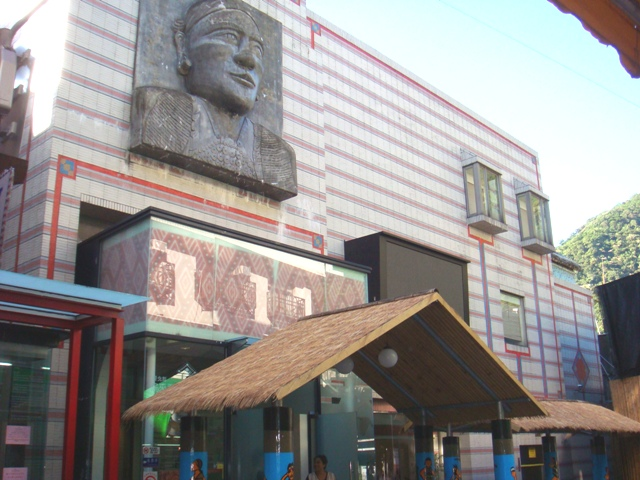
- Established: 1 October 2005
- Location: Wulai, New Taipei, Taiwan
- Coordinates: 24°51′50″N 121°33′05″E
- Type: museum
- Management: Indigenous Peoples Department
- Website: Official website (in Chinese)

The Wulai Atayal Museum (traditional Chinese: 烏來泰雅民族博物館; simplified Chinese: 乌来泰雅民族博物馆; pinyin: Wūlái Tàiyǎ Mínzú Bówùguǎn) is a museum about local aboriginal culture on Wulai Old Street in Wulai District, New Taipei, Taiwan.

== History ==
In the late 1990s, the Taipei County Government came forward with a plan to established the Wulai Atayal Museum and gave a subsidy of more than NT$30 million to Wulai Township Office to construct the museum. The construction of the museum began on 18 July 2001. The construction for the structure of the main building was completed in February 2003. On 29 October 2003, Taipei County Magistrate Su Tseng-chang named the museum as Taipei County Wulai Atayal Museum. The first phase of the project was completed in June 2004. On 1 January 2005, the operations and management of the museum was transferred from Bureau of Cultural Affairs to Scenic Special Area Management Office of the Construction Bureau. The second phase of the project was completed in July 2005. The official opening of the museum was held on 1 October 2005. On 1 July 2007, the museum operation was transferred again to the Indigenous Peoples Department.

== Architecture ==
The museum is a three-story building house in a building surrounded by rows of checkered-shape patterns. A large aboriginal statue stands at the top of the museum building.

== Exhibition ==
The museum displays the history, customs, culture, rituals, religious faith and festivals of the Atayal aboriginal tribe. The ground floor displays artifacts regarding origins, migration and natural ecology of Wulai, the middle floor displays face tattoo culture and the top floor displays the daily life and traditional crafts.

== Transportation ==
The museum is accessible by bus from Taipei Main Station.

== See also ==
- List of museums in Taiwan
- Atayal Resort
- Taiwanese aborigines
- Atayal people
