= Walis Nokan =

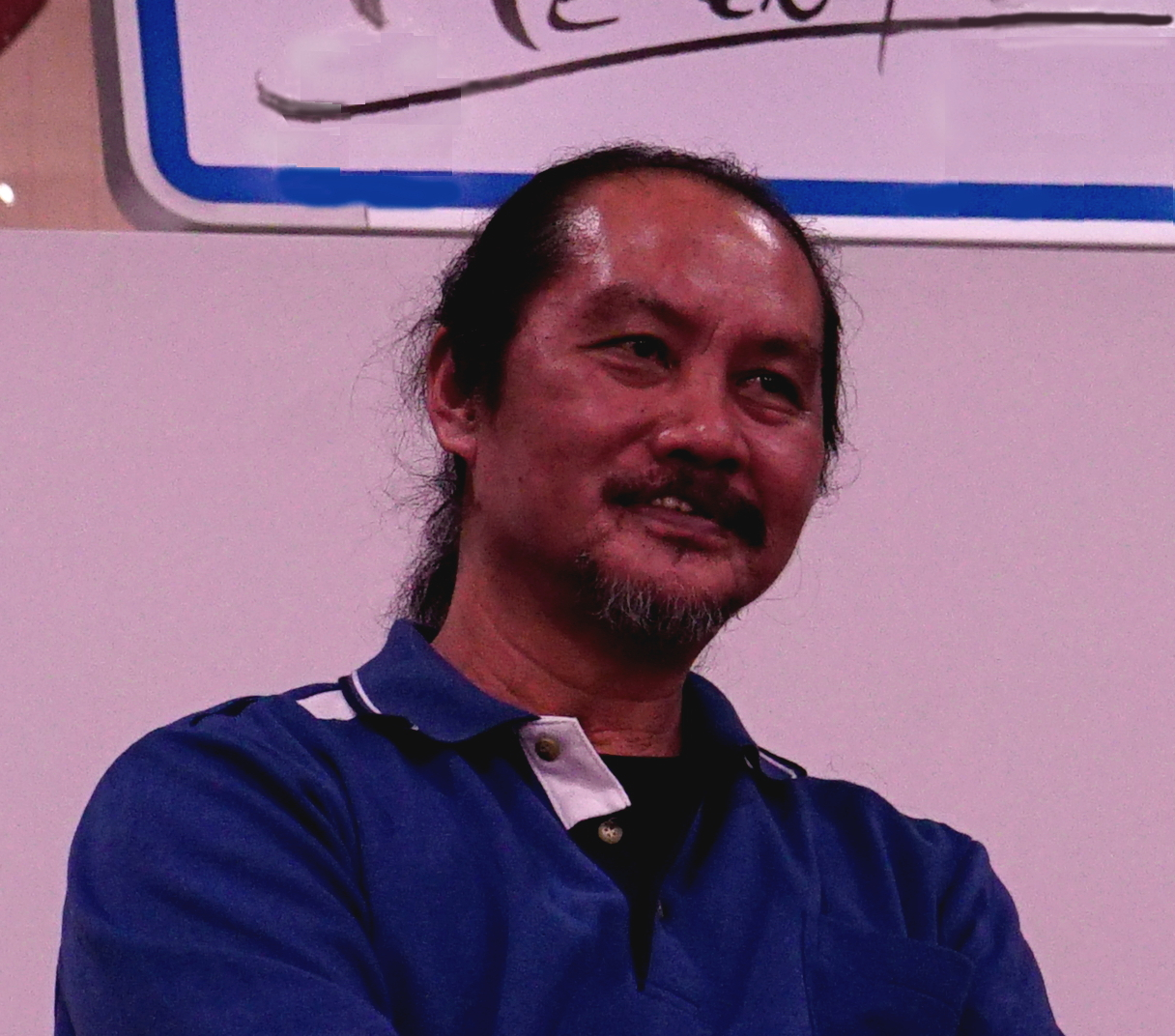
Portrait of Walis Nokan.

Walis Nokan (born 22 August 1961) is an indigenous Pai-Peinox-Tayal writer from M'ihu community in Taiwan. Walis began his writing career under the pen names such as Wu Chun-chieh (吳俊傑), Liu Ao (柳翱), and Walis Yukan. His works focus on the lives of the working class and have gone through various literary stages that reflect his evolving perspectives, shifting from embracing Han Chinese values and being indifferent to his community to beginning to care about the lives of the working class and actively returning to his community and settling down, working on the preservation of indigenous culture.

Walis Nokan has received multiple literary awards and significantly contributed to indigenous literature. He founded the magazines the Aboriginal News (原報) and Hunter Culture Magazine (獵人文化), as well as the Taiwan Indigenous Humanities Research Center, providing platforms for indigenous people to voice beyond mainstream media.

== Activities ==
Walis began his writing career under his Chinese name Wu Chun-chieh while he was a student, reflecting a period of political tension in Taiwan and surrealism characteristic of Taiwanese modernist literature in the 1970s with his poetry and essays. He was later influenced by the poetry of Wu Sheng, which changed his perspective on modern poetry and motivated him to pay more attention to the lives of the underprivileged. No. 3 of Taiwan Literature: English Translation Series (1998), a special issue dedicated to Taiwanese Indigenous literature, includes two of his poems. English translations of his poems can also be found in various anthologies, such as Frontier Taiwan: An Anthology of Modern Chinese Poetry (2001), Mercury Rising: Featuring Contemporary Poetry from Taiwan (2003), Sailing to Formosa: A Poetic Companion to Taiwan (2005). A Son of Taiwanese: Stories of Government Atrocities (2021), an anthology co-edited by Howard Goldblatt and Sylvia Li-chun Lin, includes three of Walis Nokan’s short stories depicting how Indigenous people of Taiwan were mistreated during the White Terror period.

In 1985, Walis Nokan was exposed to Taiwanese socialism and began to document his community. Subsequently, he began to comment on the media under his indigenous name (misspelled as Walis Yukan), advocating for the voices of the marginalized. Some of these writings were collected in The Knife Drawn (番刀出鞘) and published in 1992. In 1989 and 1990, he co-founded the magazines the Aboriginal News (原報) and Hunter Culture Magazine (獵人文化) respectively, allowing him to conduct field research in the communities and gain a deeper understanding of the challenges faced by the Indigenous communities in the mountains and policy shortcomings.

== Controversies ==
Walis Nokan was accused of sexual harassment during Taiwan's #MeToo movement in 2023. Walis Nokan then filed defamation lawsuits against a total of five whistleblowers and supporters who spoke out. The whistleblowers who witness the incidents and the supporters were all acquitted in April 2024. During the investigation, more evidence of Walis Nokan's alleged sexual harassment emerged, and the prosecutor confirmed that Walis Nokan had indeed engaged in inappropriate physical behavior towards the victims.
