= Jianshi, Hsinchu =

Mountain indigenous township of Hsinchu County, Taiwan

Coordinates: 24°34′34″N 121°18′29″E

Jianshi Township 尖石鄉
- Mountain indigenous township
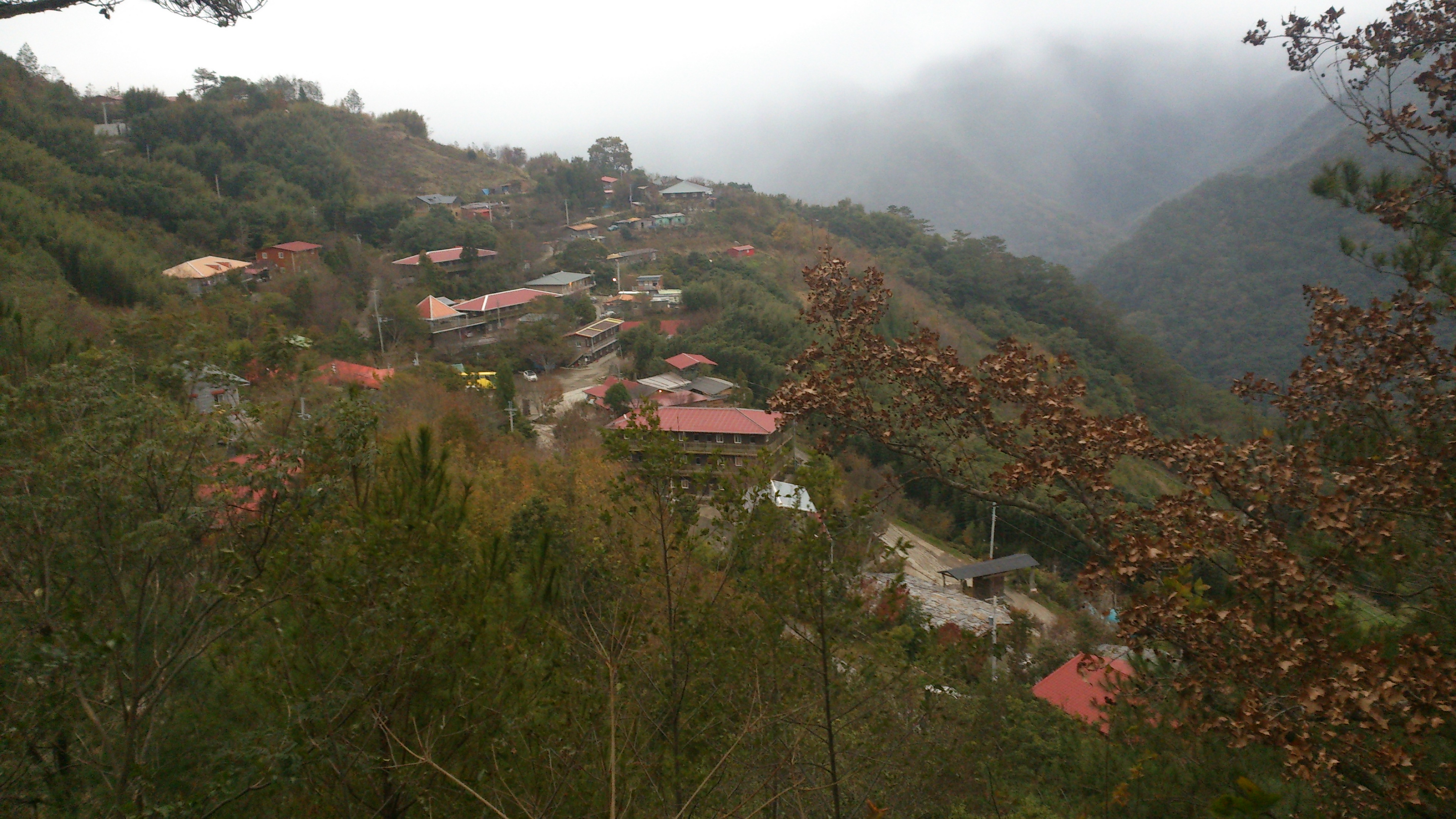

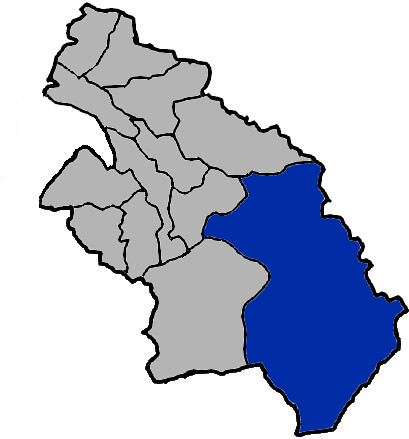
- Jianshi Township in Hsinchu County
- Location: Hsinchu County, Taiwan

Area
  - Total: 528 km^{2} (204 sq mi)

Population (February 2023)
  - Total: 9,532
  - Density: 18.1/km^{2} (46.8/sq mi)
- Website: www.hccst.gov.tw/iframcontent_edit.php?menu=2536&typeid=2545

Jianshi Township (Chinese: 尖石鄉; pinyin: Jiānshí Xiāng) is a mountain indigenous township in Hsinchu County in northern Taiwan. It had an estimated population of 9,532 as of February 2023. The main population is the indigenous Atayal people.

== Administrative divisions ==
Administrative divisions of Wufeng Township

The township is divided into seven villages, which are:
1 Yixing Village
2 Jiale Village
3 Xinle Village
4 Jinping Village
5 Meihua Village
6 Xiuluan Village
7 Yufeng Village

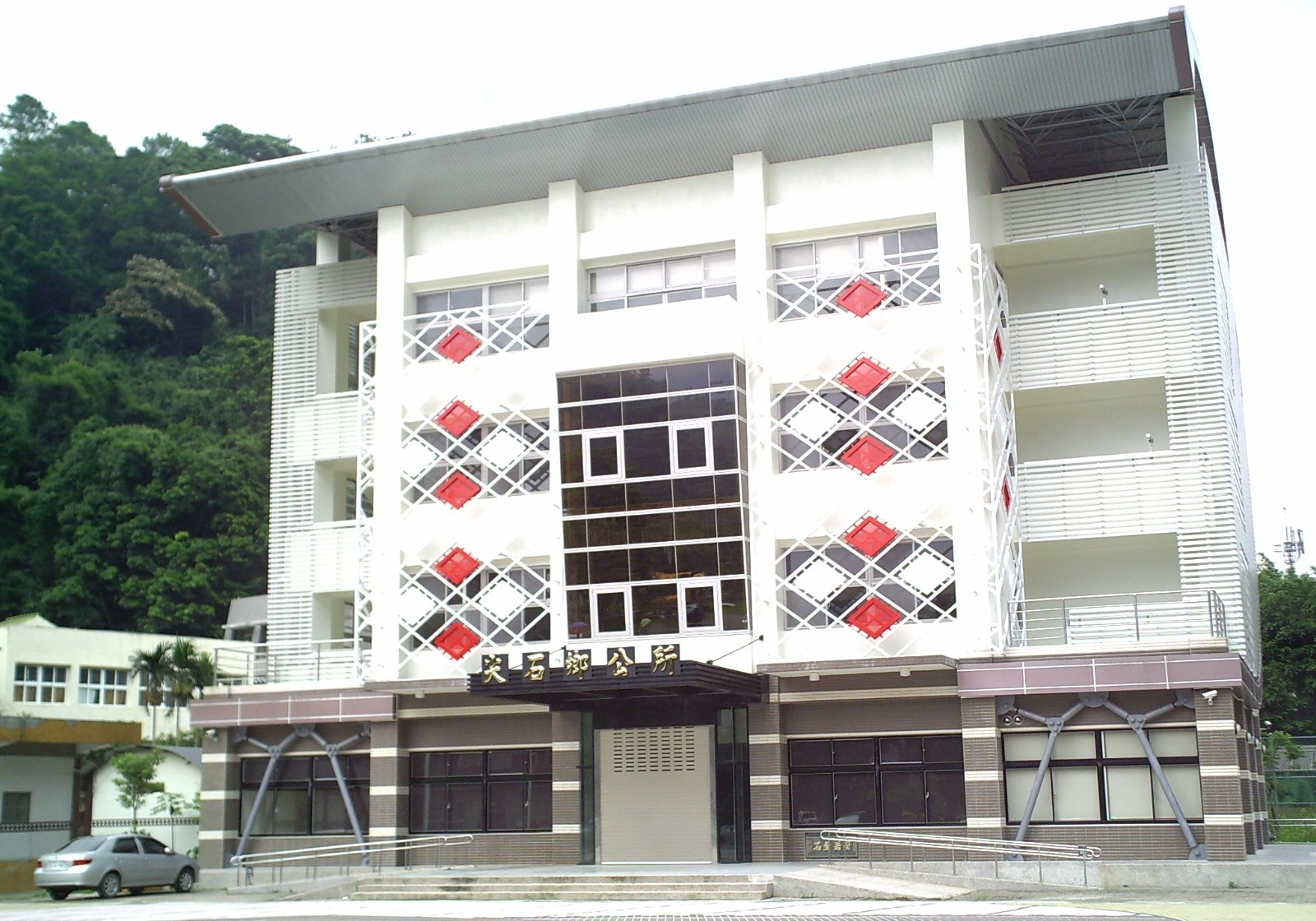
Jianshi Township Office

== Tourist attraction ==
- Dabajian Mountain
- Tapung Old Fort

== Notable natives ==
- Joanne Tseng, actress and singer
- Landy Wen, singer
