= Taiwanese rock =

Rock music from Taiwan

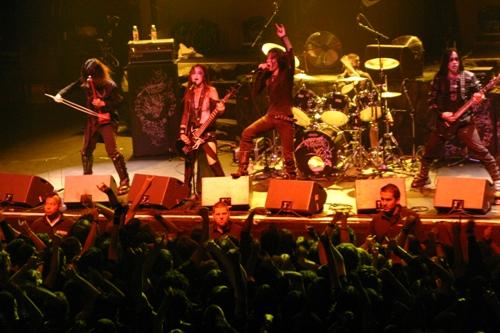
ChthoniC

The Taiwanese rock is rock music from Taiwan. Taiwanese rock has been influenced by British, American, and Japanese rock over the latter half of the 20th century. As a genre, it is nurtured by regular festivals, notably the annual Spring Scream, Hohaiyan and Formoz festivals.

== History ==
Early listeners to Western rock music in Taiwan were university intellectuals who were often bilingual. The pioneer of Taiwanese rock was Xue Yue, also known as Simon Hsueh (1954-1990), who debuted as part of the campus folk movement prior to the end of martial law in Taiwan. Xue, a part-time drummer in the American Military Club, released his first album The Stage of Rock and Roll in 1984; collaborating with famous contemporary poets such as Chen Ko-hua and Hsia Yu for the lyrics of his later albums. Xue died in 1990, shortly after the release of his fifth album.

In 1995, Freddy Lim founded the band ChthoniC with a group of friends. In 2000, the group was invited to perform at the Fuji Rock Festival in Japan, which inspired Lim. The band had previously played at the Formoz Festival, then an intercollegiate event held by the Northern Taiwan Rock Association; Lim created a new company, the Taiwan Rock Association, and broadened the reach of the festival. It continued until 2008 and then was reestablished in 2013.

=== Influences ===
Taiwanese rock, like other genres in Taiwan, was influenced by the Modern Folk Song Movement of the mid-1970s that emerged partially in response to American cultural imperialism.

== Groups ==
Major Taiwanese rock acts include:

- 1976
- Blacklist Studio
- Chang Chen-yue
- Cherry Boom
- ChthoniC
- Dong Cheng Wei
- EggPlantEgg
- Elephant Gym
- F.I.R.
- Fire EX.
- Guntzepaula
- LTK Commune
- Mayday
- No Party for Cao Dong
- Power Station
- Seraphim
- Shin
- Sodagreen
- Wu Bai
- Y2J (Shenmu yu Tong)
