= Atayal people =

Indigenous Taiwanese people

Tayal, Tayan
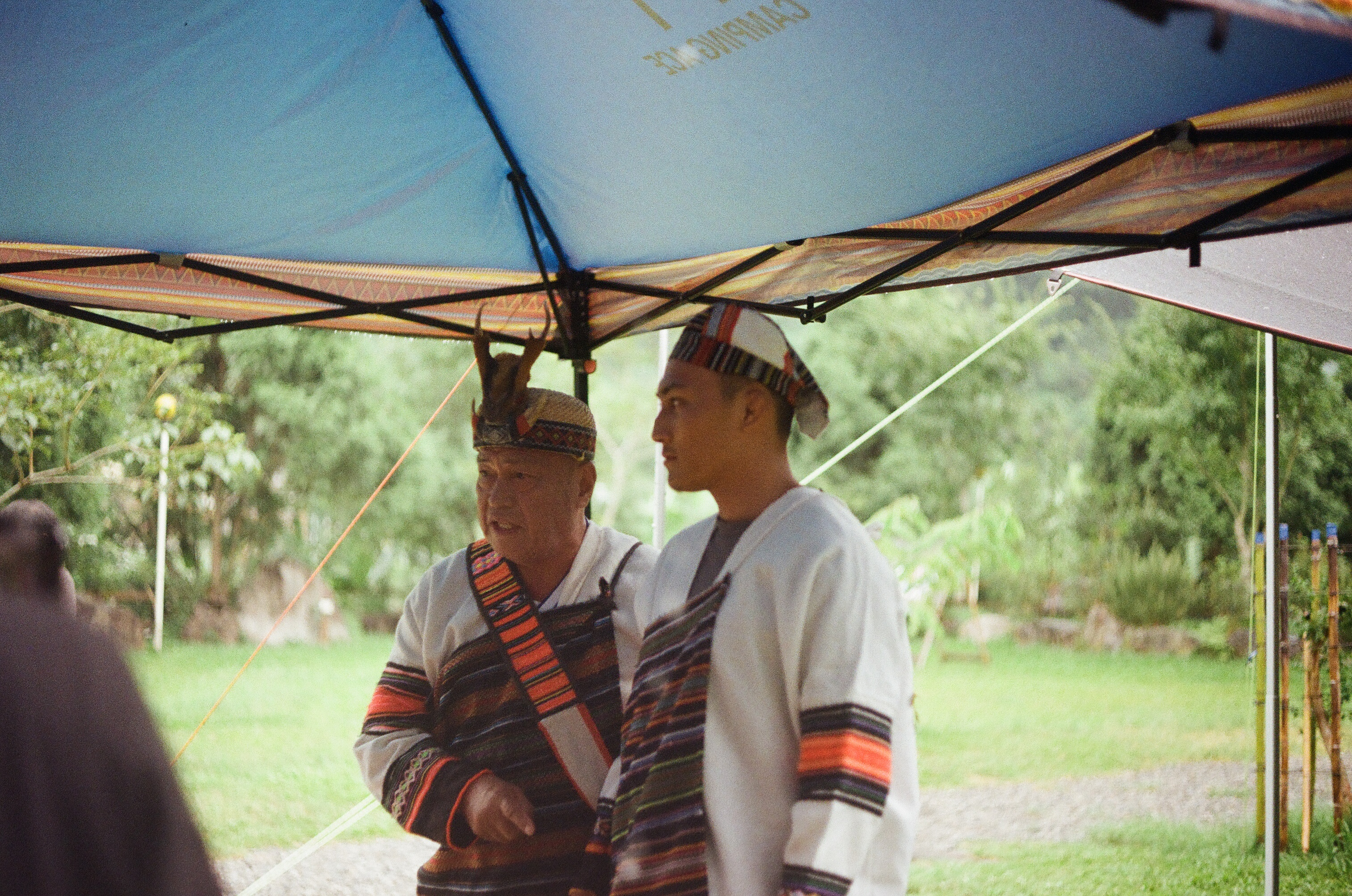

Total population
- 94,425 (2022, Nov)

Regions with significant populations
- Taiwan

Languages
- Atayal, Mandarin, Yilan Creole Japanese

Religion
- Animism, Christianity

Related ethnic groups
- Seediq, Truku, Kavalan, Taiwanese indigenous peoples

The Atayal (Atayal: Tayal; Chinese: 泰雅; pinyin: Tàiyǎ), also known as the Tayal and the Tayan, are a Taiwanese Indigenous ethnic group. The Atayal people number around 90,000, approximately 15.9% of Taiwan's total Indigenous population, making them the third-largest Indigenous group. The preferred endonym is "Tayal", although official English translations of documents supplied by the Taiwanese government name them as "Atayal".

== Etymology ==
The Atayal word for Atayal is tayal, meaning "human" or "man". The word the people use to refer to themselves is Tayal, almost never Atayal.

== Origins ==
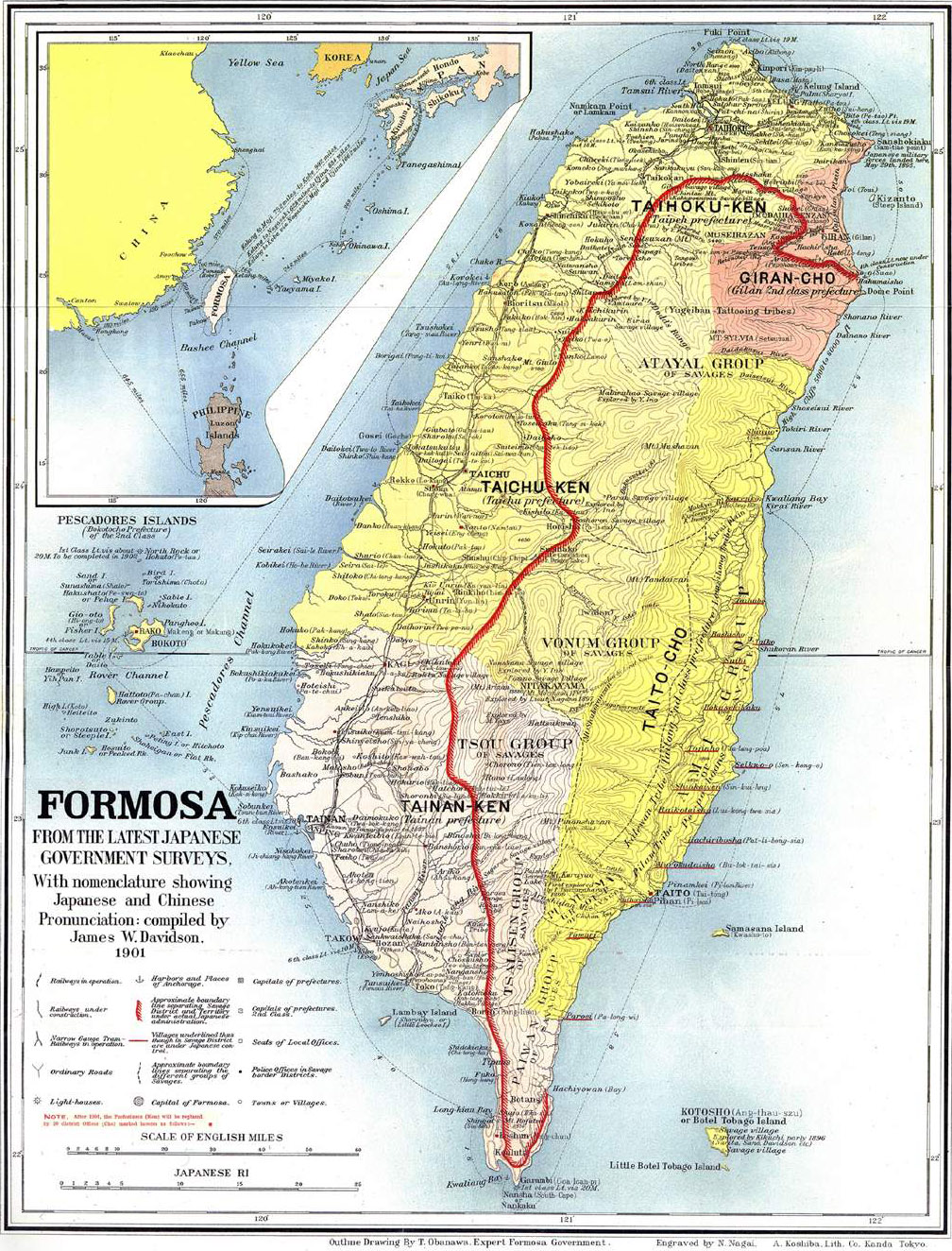
1901 map of Taiwan, with "Atayal Group" marked.

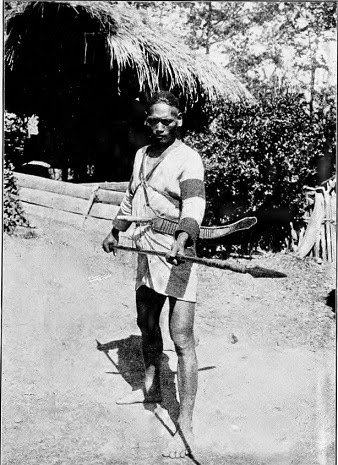
Photograph of Atayal warrior taken in the 1900s.

The first record of Atayal inhabitance is found near the upper reaches of the Zhuoshui River. During the late 17th century, they crossed the Central Mountain Ranges into the wilderness of the east. They then settled in the Liwu River valley. Seventy-nine Atayal villages can be found here.

=== Genetics ===
Taiwan has been home to a number of Austronesian Indigenous groups since before 4,000 BC. However, genetic analysis suggests that the different peoples may have different ancestral source populations originating in mainland Asia, and developed in isolation from each other. The Atayal people are believed to have migrated to Taiwan from Southern China or Southeast Asia. Genetic studies have also found similarities between the Atayal and other people in the Philippines and Thailand, and to a lesser extent with south China and Vietnam. The Atayal are genetically distinct from the Amis people, who are the largest Indigenous group in Taiwan, as well as from the Han Taiwanese people, suggesting little mingling between these people. Studies on Mitochondrial DNA (mtDNA) polymorphisms suggest ancient migrations of two lineages of the various peoples into Taiwan approximately 11,000–26,000 years ago.

Recent DNA studies show that the Lapita people and modern Polynesians have a common ancestry with the Atayal and the Kankanaey people of the northern Philippines.

The Atayal are visibly different from the Han Taiwanese.

=== Folklore ===
According to stories told by their elders, the first Atayal ancestors appeared when a stone, Pinspkan, cracked apart. There were three people, but one decided to go back into the stone. One man and one woman who lived together for a very long time loved each other very much. But the man was shy and wouldn't dare approach her. Whereupon, the woman came up with an idea. She left her home and found some coal with which to blacken her face so she could pose as a different woman.

After several days, she crept back into their home and the man mistook her for another woman and they lived happily together. Not long after, the couple bore children, fulfilling their mission of procreating the next generation. The Atayal custom of face tattooing may have come from the woman blackening her face in the story.

== Culture ==
=== Lifestyle ===
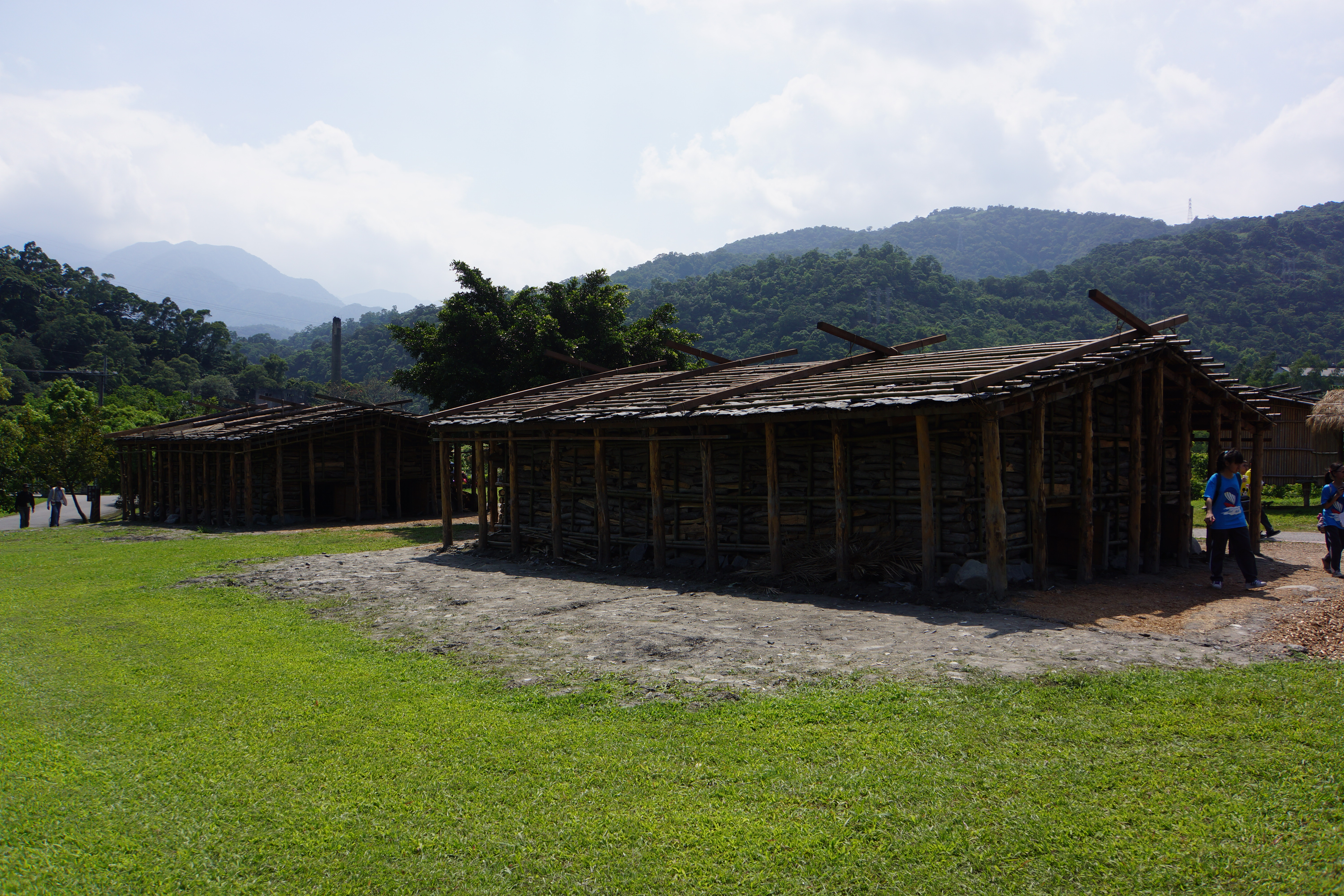
Traditional Atayal houses.

The Atayal people have maintained their traditions and cultures for a thousand years. They are traditionally self-sufficient through fishing, hunting, gathering and farming through slash and burn. Atayal people also adhere to strict gender roles, with men practicing hunting and net-knotting, and women practicing weaving. They also have culturally specific musical instruments and dances.

The Atayal were known as skilled warriors. In a practice illegal since the Japanese Colonial Era (1895–1945), for a man to earn his facial tattoo, he had to bring back at least one human head; these heads, or skulls, were highly honored, given food and drink, and expected to bring good harvests to the fields. (See Headhunting.) The Atayal people are also known for the case of the Wushe Incident, in which they participated in an uprising against colonial Japanese forces.

The Lalaw Behuw, a type of long knife, was a weapon used by the Atayal people.

=== Traditional beliefs ===
The concept of Gaga is fundamental to Atayal society. Gaga functioned as a way of living and an unwritten set of rules that governs all aspects of life. Passed down through generations, gaga emphasizes morality, harmony, and mutual respect within the community.

==== Roles and enforcement ====
- Leader and elders are the custodians of gaga, interpreting and enforcing its principles while ensuring its continuity. Their role is critical, as they provide guidance and serve as mediators in community disputes.
- Gaga dictates appropriate behavior in marriage, community interactions, rituals, and even hunting practices. It establishes expectations that promote social harmony and prevent conflicts.

==== Cultural importance ====
- Adhering to gaga ensures social cohesion and the preservation of Atayal traditions. It fosters a sense of belonging and identity among community members. Violations of these norms could result in ostracism or exclusion from important ceremonies, highlighting its significance in maintaining order. Such consequences serve as deterrent against behaviour that could disrupt social harmony.
- The influence of previous generations is also reflected in Atayal naming systems, where a newborn is named after their father, or their mother (if father has died). For instance, the father named "Yukan Dayung" has a child called "Yumin", the full name of the child will be "Yumin Yukan". The next generation will take on the first name of their father, so on. It reflected the significance of seniority in Atayal culture, constantly reminding the future generations through their names.

==== Traditional beliefs in modern times ====
After the Japanese expulsion of Atayal from the hills, the tribe gradually incorporated modern lifestyle and values into their daily practices. Gender roles have gradually spaced out, diminishing the boundaries between genders. People in the tribe have also taken up roles in the government and academia after receiving education. Education has also provided a medium for Atayal tribe to document their culture and educate future generations more effectively.

=== Traditional Atayal houses ===
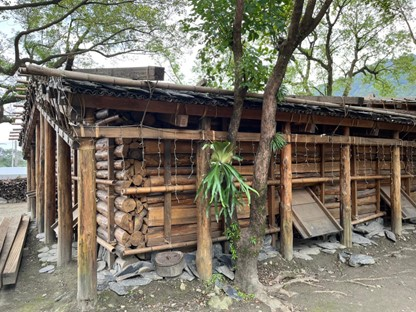
Exterior of Traditional Atayal House

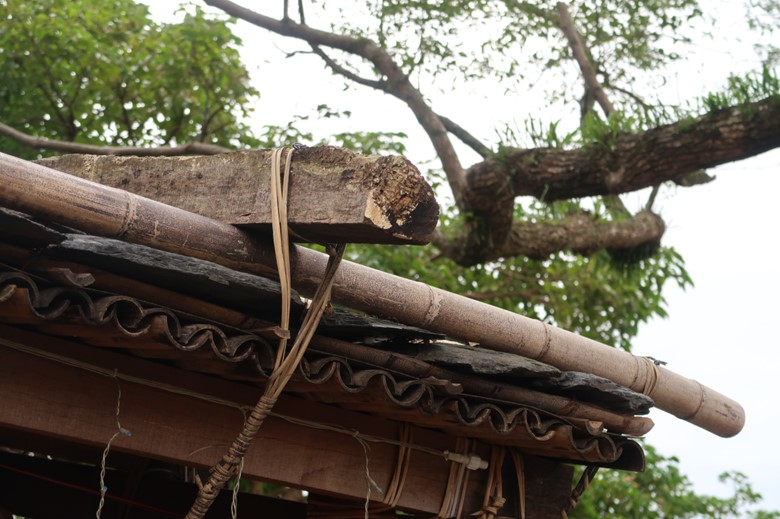
Six-layered structure of Traditional Atayal House located in Dong'ao, Yilan, Taiwan.

Traditional Atayal houses are rectangular structures, typically built using multiple layers for the roof, including bamboo, bark, stone, wood, and thatch. This multilayered roofing system provides insulation and protection against the elements. With the Atayal population widely distributed across Taiwan, their houses vary in style. One common type is the half-underground house, especially found in Nantou County, Yilan County, and Taichung County. In the Nan'ao community, family houses are built using bamboo, rocks, rattan, and wood. These houses are dug downwards from the base, with half of the structure located below the ground, providing natural insulation. The length of a Nan'ao-style family house is usually the arm span of three adults, while the width is the arm span of two adults.

The roofs of Atayal houses in Nan'ao Township are typically made of bamboo and cypress bark as the base, paved with stone slabs, and secured with wooden strips. These houses also feature windows on three sides for ventilation and lighting. However, the windows are usually only half-open to prevent enemy attacks. Additionally, steps leading into the house are flanked by bamboo screens to provide protection against spear attacks.

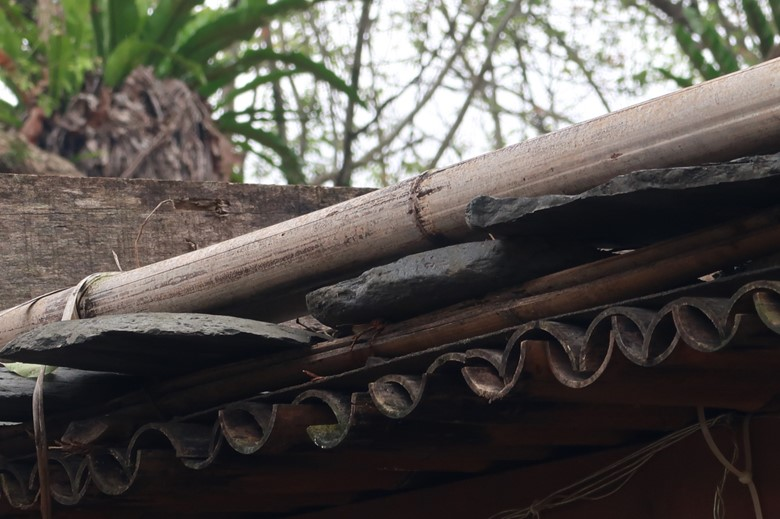
Roof structure from slates, bamboos, and firewood.

==== Interior layout ====
The interior of Atayal houses usually consists of earthen floors, with beds raised on stilts to prevent moisture and pests. In the case of half-underground houses, four beds are placed in the four corners of the room. Two small beds, hanging upside down on the ceiling on the left and right sides, serve as beds for the ancestors' spirits. These ancestral beds also function as storage areas, called "gaga." The storage on the left contains men's hunting tools, while the storage on the right holds women's weaving materials.

For cooking and heating, Atayal houses incorporate stoves into the living space. In half-underground houses, there are typically two three-stone stoves, used both for warmth and meal preparation. The layout of these houses follows a distinct division, with separate spaces designated for men and women. This division extends to storage, ensuring that each gender has a designated area for their tools and materials—hunting equipment for men and weaving tools for women.

==== Gender roles and restrictions ====
Strict gender roles are adhered to within Atayal culture. Men are not permitted to touch women's weaving tools, while women are forbidden from handling men's hunting tools, such as guns and bows. This separation is deeply rooted in cultural beliefs, as each gender has its own designated role within the Atayal household. Crossing these boundaries is believed to bring misfortune.

===== Community pavilion (Pslyan) =====
In addition to residential structures, the Atayal tribe also constructs community pavilions, known as Pslyan. These structures were initially developed for discussions and negotiations during Japanese colonial rule, with Japanese authorities involved in tribal management. In later times, these pavilions became gathering spaces where tribal elders and community members convene to discuss governance, cultural rituals, and conflict resolution.

==== Structure and use ====
Community pavilions are situated in open spaces and are typically larger than individual houses, designed to accommodate a large number of people. Featuring a rectangular layout, these pavilions often include a central fire pit for warmth and cooking during gatherings. The open design facilitates air circulation and encourages social interaction. Similar to residential houses, the pavilions are constructed using sustainable materials like bamboo and wood, reflecting a deep connection to their environment.

=== Three-stone stove (hka') in Atayal culture ===
The stability of the three-stone stove is based on the principle of "three points forming a plane," which creates a stable pivot. In contrast, using four or five stones can lead to instability due to the creation of too many surfaces, making it harder to balance the pot. To enhance stability, one end of each stone is slightly buried in the ground, maintaining a height of about 20 to 30 cm above the ground. When a pot is placed on this structure and firewood is added, it forms a three-channel pathway for the fire pit. This design ensures both stability and control, allowing for proper airflow and more vigorous combustion.

Endless fire

The concept of fire is vital in Atayal culture. The three stones used in the stove should be positioned on two side of the house. Three-stone stove (hka') is a hallmark of Indigenous culture. When we see a stove made of four stones in the mountains, it is not representative of the Atayal tradition.

For the Atayal people, the act of lighting a fire signifies that someone is home. Fire symbolizes the life of the Atayal community.

Construction and functions

The upper part of the house is constructed using wood and bamboo, secured with yellow rattan. The more yellow rattan is burned, the tighter and stronger it becomes.

Fire is important within the house to keep it warm and dry. Not does it serve for cooking, the fire also prevents moisture, deters insects, and inhibits material decay of the house. The smoke produced rises and wafts toward the shelves "gaga", where hunting tools, rattan hats, and weapons are stored, keeping them dry.

The ancestors of the Atayal people are buried underground below bed, and the fire helps keep them warm. Atayal people believe that the smoke from three-stone stoves (hka') carry messages to their ancestors, ensuring that ancestors can hear their promise and thus, they will not break their vows.

=== Hunting ===
Instructed by customs and guidance by elders, Atayal men are trained to hunt since a young age. Common prey included wild boars, Reeves's muntjac, and goats. Historically, headhunting enemies was a common practice in order to protect the tribe, gaining face tattoos and taking revenge. Nature has played a large role in Atayal community; therefore, their Indigenous knowledge system is centered around the tribe's respect and feedback and return. As a result, hunters are taught not to overhunt, deforest, and hunt younger animals. Longstanding gender roles also forbid women's participation in hunting or touching men's hunting tools, with the curse of hunters will return empty-handed, facing danger or bad luck during hunting. Hunting knives are unique to each hunter, which will be buried with the hunter when he passes away and shall not be inherited by younger hunters. Group hunting practices should abide by the leader's order, reflecting Atayal hunters' adherence to tradition and respect towards the elders' experience.

Being a hunter in Atayal society does not only represent the ability to hunt, but also having a strong sense of direction, understanding of mountain ecology, awareness towards natural surroundings to navigate around and the skill of trap-setting.

=== Traditional dress ===
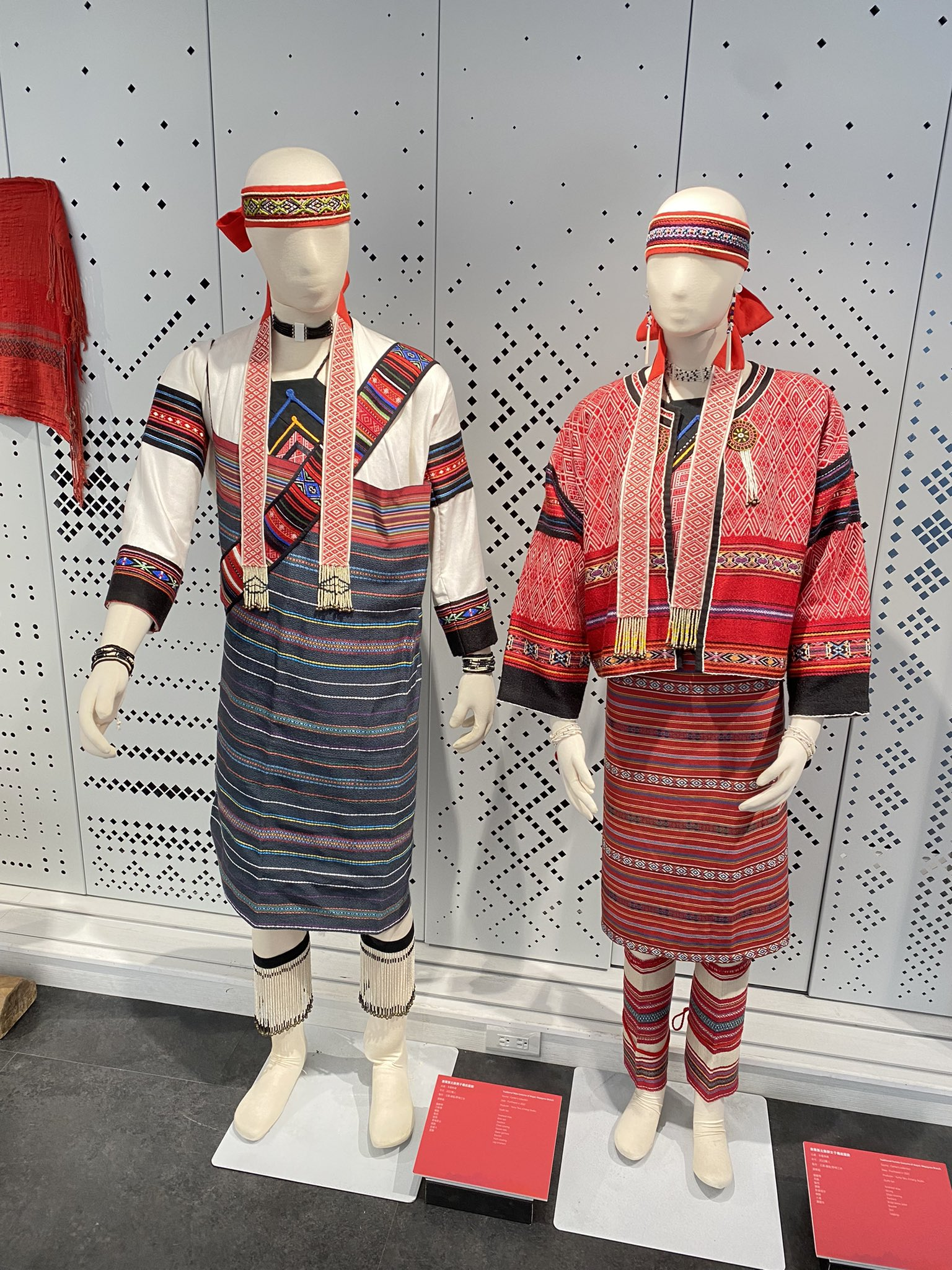
Atayal dress.

The Atayal are proficient weavers, incorporating symbolic patterns and designs on their traditional dress. The features are mainly of geometric style, and the colors are bright and dazzling. Most of the designs are argyles and horizontal lines. In Atayal culture, the horizontal lines represent the rainbow bridge which leads the dead to where the ancestors' spirits live. Argyles, on the other hand, represent ancestors' eyes protecting the Atayal. The favorite color of this culture is red because it represents blood and power.

==== Weaving ====
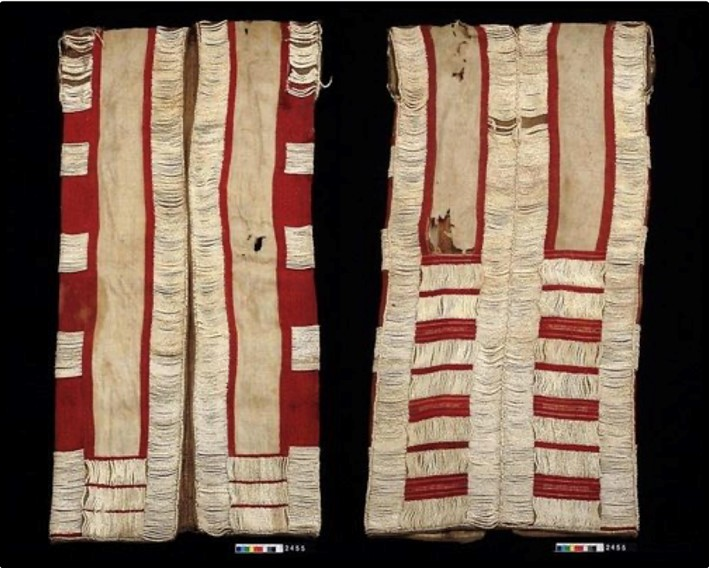
Lukkus-kaxa, founded in 1957 in Dong'yue (Dong'ao) Village, Yilan, Taiwan

Possessing the skill of weaving is essential for every woman in the Atayal tribe. Weaving threads are produced from ramie (Kgi), where the plant is shredded, pestle and knitted into smooth threads (Nuka). The threads are then cleaned by broiling. Tapioca roots and Shoulang yams are used for coloring threads to red ochre color.

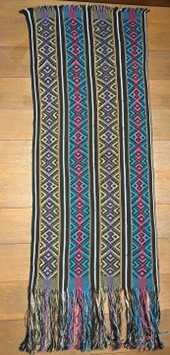
Variation of diamond patterns in Atayal weaving. (Yahaw Pihu, Dong'ao.)

Atayal people loom on the ground with a unique warping frame. The basic structure of the warping frame includes a base and 3 pillars. A weaving box placed on the ground is used for storing wrapped threads for backstrap loom.

Geometrical patterns such as diamonds and parallel lines are commonly seen in Atayal woven accessories. The diamond shape symbolizes the eye of ancestors, which symbolizes ancestors' protection and blessings in Atayal culture. The parallel lines represent a rainbow bridge crossed by spirits of face-tattooed Atayal hunters and weavers in their afterlife to reunite with their ancestors (rutux).

Lukkus-kaxa, is a valuable clothing for tribe leaders, warriors and weavers who are able to produce them. They are made by knitting thousands to millions of tiny beads from giant clams (tridacninae) onto garments. As shell beads are precious in Atayal culture, lukkus-kaxa is an ancient form of currency, a family heirloom, as well as a gift for engagement and compensation in conflicts.

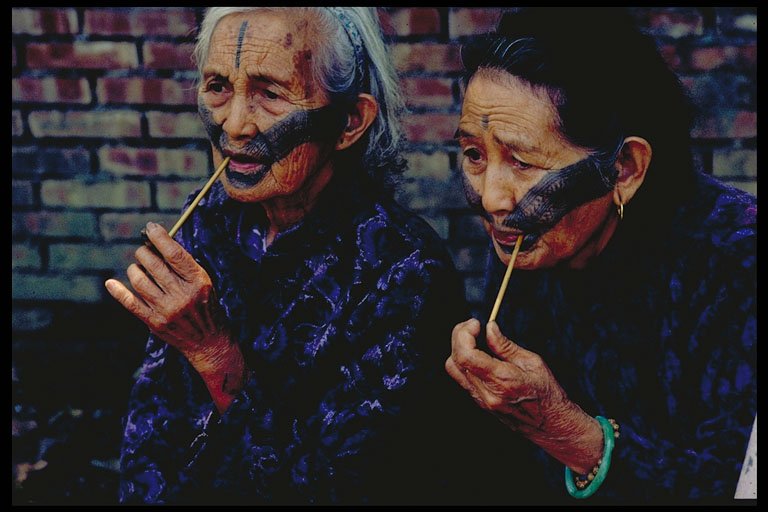
Two elder Atayal women with facial tattoos as a symbol of maturity, which was a tradition for both males and females. The custom was banned during Japanese rule.

=== Facial tattoos ===
The Atayal people are also known for using facial tattooing and teeth filing in coming-of-age initiation rituals. The facial tattoo, in Squliq Atayal, is called ptasan. In the past, both men and women had to show that they had performed a major task associated with adulthood before their faces could be tattooed. For a man, he had to take the head of an enemy, showing his valor as a hunter to protect and provide for his people, while women had to be able to weave cloth. A girl would learn to weave when she was about 10 or 12, and she had to master the skill in order to earn her tattoo. Only those with tattoos could marry, and, should they die, only those with tattoos could cross the hongu utux, or spirit bridge (the rainbow) to the hereafter.

==== Eligibility ====
Only those who adhered to strict moral standards, such as abstaining from extramarital or premarital sexual relationships, were eligible for facial tattoos. The complexity of the tattoos reflected an individual's abilities—hunters who demonstrated exceptional skill in providing for the tribe and weavers who mastered intricate designs were honored with elaborate tattoos.

Male tattooing is relatively simple, with only two bands down the forehead and chin. Once a man came of age he would have his forehead tattooed; after fathering a child, his bottom chin was tattooed. For women, tattooing was done on the cheek, typically from the ears across both cheeks to the lips forming a V shape. While tattooing on a man is relatively quick, on a woman it may take up to 10 hours. Tattooing was performed only by women. The tattooing was performed using a group of needles lashed to a stick called atok tapped into the skin using a hammer called totsin. Black ash would then be rubbed into the skin to create the tattoo. Healing could take up to a month.

==== Cultural importance ====
Tattoos symbolized adulthood, purity, connection with ancestors, and represented skill recognition of elders. For women, tattoos often indicated their readiness for marriage and their proficiency in weaving, while for men, it highlighted their bravery and achievements in hunting. The absence of face tattoos obstructs both men and women to marriage, which leads to crowding out by the tribe.

The Japanese banned the practice of tattooing in 1930 because of its association with headhunting. Still, face tattoos remained as a powerful emblem of Atayal identity and pride. With the introduction of Christianity, the practice further declined, and tattoos were only seen on the elderly. However, some young people in recent years have attempted to revive the practice. By 2018 only one tattooed elder survived, Lawa Piheg, who was tattooed when she was 8. Lawa Piheg died on 14 September 2019.

=== Rattan and bamboo weaving ===
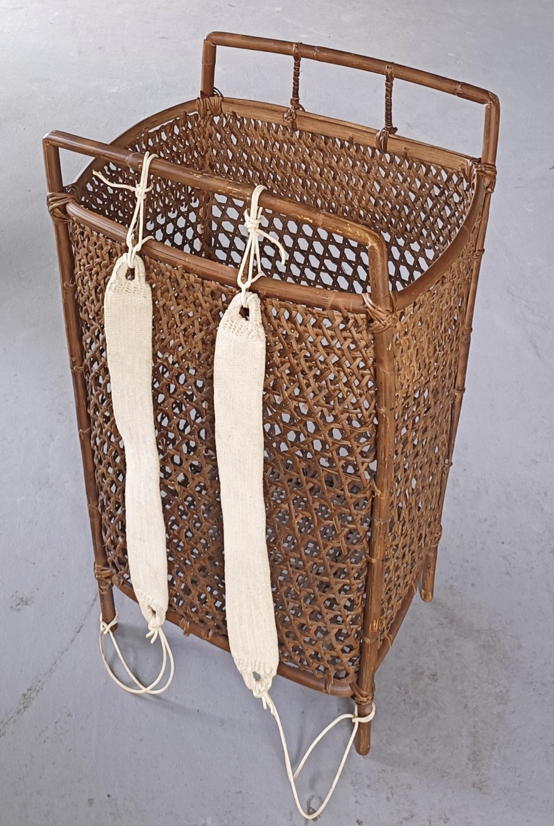
The Atayal rattan and bamboo backpack

The Atayal weave bamboo and rattan items such as kiri', qbun, tokan, bluku', and gitu'. These are for women's use when harvesting crops or transporting goods, and have a large capacity. The best bamboo material to use is fresh bamboo from March to April, when the bamboo shoots have just fallen off the bamboo shoots and the leaves have just begun to grow. To make a medium-sized round skip, for example, the bamboo is first cut with a small knife (buli') into about 350 gabions (rruma') about 2 feet 5 inches long, then the gabions are woven horizontally and vertically into a large quadrilateral shape, the edges are trimmed to a rounded shape, and the edges are finally closed with a yellow rattan (qwayux).

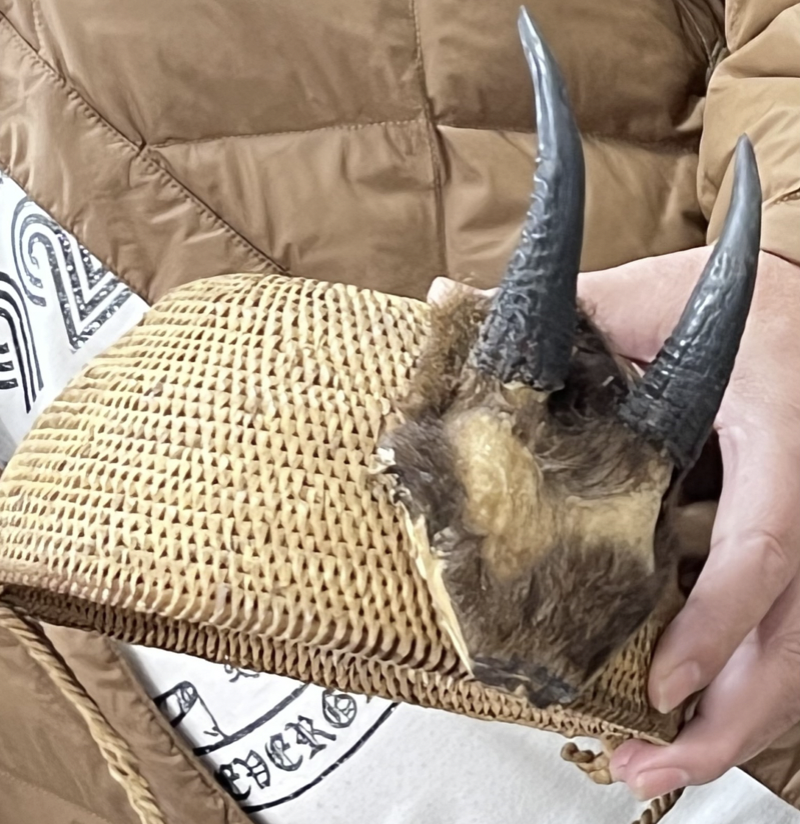
Rattan hat

The qbubu' (rattan hat) is worn by men when they go out to protect their heads, but it also serves as an aesthetic and identity statement. The most common form of the qbubu' is the rimless bowl, occasionally with an attached brim. Hunters covered their hats with animal skins or teeth, and successful headhunters sewed a white circular shell plate called a mayon in the center of the forehead of their hats.

=== Net-knotting and woodwork ===
Net-knotting and woodwork is another essential skill of Atayal people. Baskets and sieves are knitted from bamboo rattans to carry hunting equipment and harvests, and their size varies by functions. Rattan caps (qbubu') are worn by men during outdoor activities, such as hunting. The strong structure from knitted rattan could protect the head from tree branches. It also serves as a presentation of identity and skills, that hunters would decorate their cap with animals' fur to portray their hunting gains.

As daggers and swords shall not be touched by women and is exclusive to the owner himself, they are strictly produced by men. Woodwork is essential to daily life, since Atayal sheaths and furniture are mainly produced from wood.

=== Bamboo Jew's harp ===
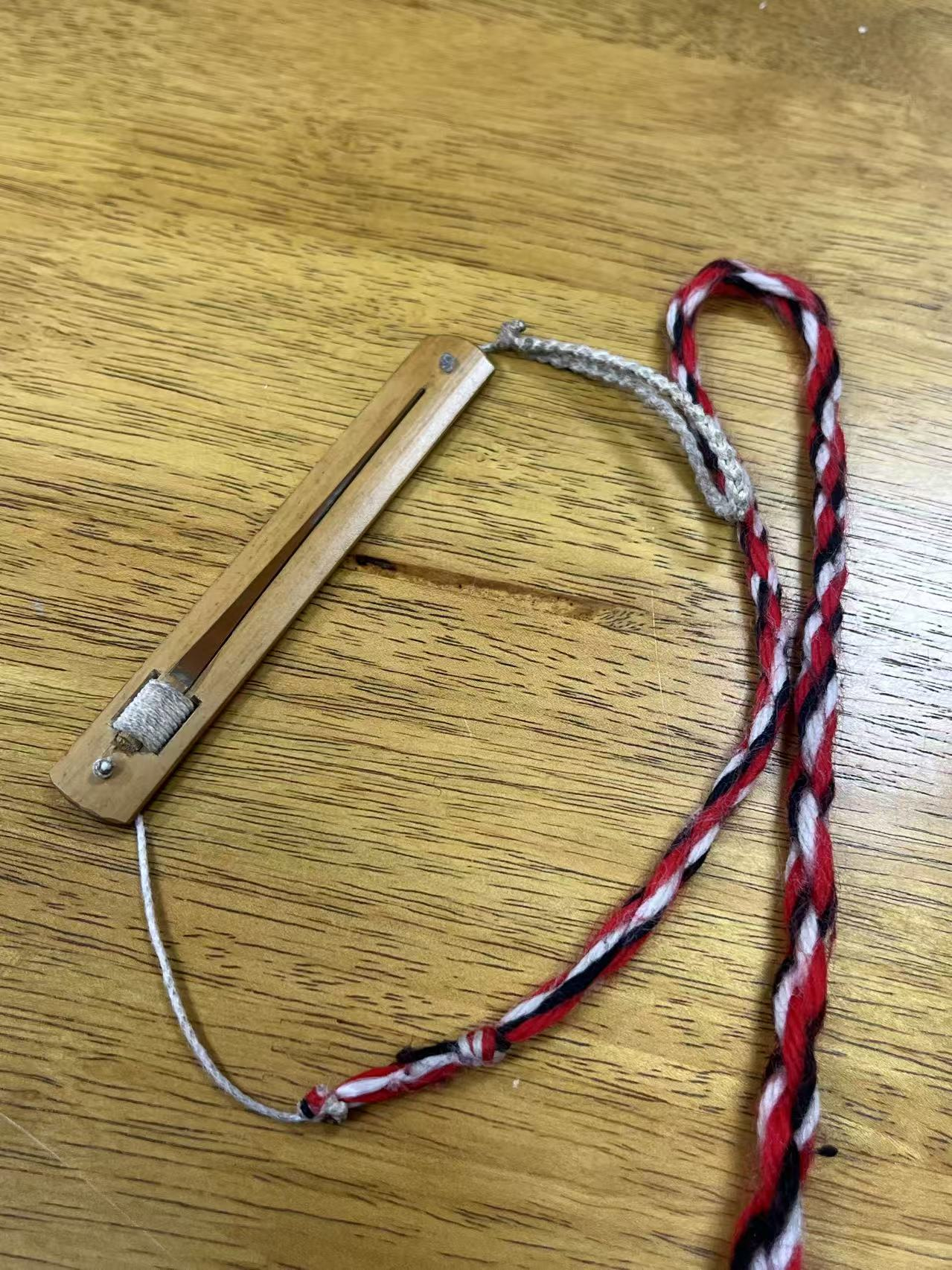
Bamboo Jew's Harp

The bamboo Jew's harp (in Atayal language: lubuw) is a traditional musical instrument that has been widely used by the Atayal people. It is mostly used for solo performances. It is used by the Atayal people for self-entertainment, communication and for love between men and women.The lubuw also finds a place in community gatherings, as an accompaniment for dancing, and in courtship dialogs where young men and women alternate playing to convey romantic interest through changing rhythms and overtones. It is suitable for both young and old, but it is generally prohibited during hunting and funerals. The Atayal people can also use the Bamboo Jew's Harp instead of actual language to convey messages, that is, to express the content originally spoken "orally" to the other party through Bamboo Jew's Harp. The Bamboo Jew's Harp is made of a piece of bamboo about 10 cm long as the body of the instrument. There is a long hole in the middle, and a thin tongue-shaped bamboo or copper reed is placed.Lubuw are produced in single-reed and multi-reed forms, traditionally from one to five reeds. By convention, harps for men are generally made entirely of bamboo, and harps for women generally combine a bamboo frame with a copper reed. Holes are drilled at both ends of the body to pass through hemp ropes. When playing, the left hand holds the instrument between the lips; the right hand pulls the hemp rope on the right end, and the sound is produced by vibration. Different tones can be produced by the shape of the mouth, and different scales can be produced by the width and thickness of the reed. The mouth is used as a resonance chamber , and by changing the length of the breath and the shape of the mouth , players can produce long and short notes , pitch shifts and overtone effects . Single - reed harps are essentially a question of rhythm and resonance , with a narrow range of fundamental pitch . Multi - reed instruments allow a wider range of pitch and denser melodic scales.

== Migration and language ==
=== The Nan'ao Atayal migration ===
The Nan'ao Atayal tribe's first significant contact with the state system began during the Japanese colonial period. To maintain public order and exploit mountain forest resources, the Governor-General's Office implemented a pacification policy towards the "raw aborigines." However, the Indigenous people living in deep mountain areas were difficult to manage and prone to armed resistance. After Governor-General Sakuma Samata took office in 1906, he adopted a military suppression policy. Through two “Aboriginal Management Plans”, they subdued and forced various aboriginal tribes to submit. Since the forest resources that the Japanese Governor-General's Office wanted to develop—the Taiping Mountain Forest—were located in the core area of the Nan'ao Atayal tribal settlements, the Nan'ao Atayal tribe submitted to the Japanese Governor-General's Office in 1908 under the implementation of the "Aboriginal Management Plan." To strengthen management and control, the Japanese Governor-General's Office constructed police patrol roads to connect all Nan'ao Atayal tribal settlements. Additionally, the Governor-General's Office implemented a collective relocation policy, gradually moving the Nan'ao Atayal tribes from deep mountain areas to coastal and foothill regions, though some tribes remained in the mountainous areas.

The relocation process of the Nan'ao Atayal tribe did not cease with the change of political power. When the Nationalist Government relocated to Taiwan, they continued the collective relocation policy from the Japanese colonial period, implementing a policy to integrate mountain areas with the plains. It wasn't until the early 1970s that the Nan'ao Atayal tribe completely relocated to the lowlands. From Figure 1, one can clearly see how the traditional settlements of the Nan'ao Atayal tribe were divided into different communities and relocated to form the current administrative layout of Nan'ao Township.

=== Language ===
All Nanao languages in Yilan County belong to the Atayal language family. Atayal has two dialects: Squliq and Ts'oli'. Both are present in Yilan County, distributed across 11 villages in Datong Township and Nanao Township. Among these, five villages—including Nanao, Bihou, Jingyue, and Wuta in Nanao Township, and Siji village in Datong Township—predominantly use the Ts'oli' dialect. The remaining six villages primarily use the Squliq dialect. The two dialects are considered to have roughly equal influence.

However, within the Atayal area of Yilan County, a unique Japanese creole developed. Although the residents are ethnically Atayal, due to Japanese language education during the colonial period and forced Japanese language use, they now no longer speak Atayal but instead use this creole. This language is mainly distributed in Hanxi Village of Datong Township, Aohua Village, Dongyue Village, and Jinyang Village of Nan'ao Township, with four tribal communities using it.

The Yilan Creole Japanese emerged in the 1930s and 1940s during the contact between Japanese colonists and the native Atayal people of southern Yilan County. Studies show that for a speaker born in 1974, the vocabulary composition was approximately 70% Japanese and 30% Atayal. However, this Japanese is not standard Japanese but rather a creole heavily influenced by the Atayal substrate language, and its grammatical structure doesn't closely resemble either Japanese or Atayal.

In these areas, students primarily learn 'Squliq Atayal' at school, creating a phenomenon where the language spoken at home differs significantly from the so-called 'mother tongue curriculum' taught at schools. This is currently known to be Taiwan's only Japanese creole.

== Atayal in modern times ==
A map showing the distribution of the two major dialect groups of the Atayal language. The Atayal people reside in central and northern Taiwan, along the Hsuehshan mountains.

The Atayal people in Taiwan live in central and northern Taiwan. The northernmost village is in Ulay District (Wulai in Chinese), about 25 kilometres south of Taipei. The Atayal Tribe The community of Smangus in Jianshi Township had become well known as a tourist destination, and an experiment in communalism.

Many Atayal are bilingual, but the Atayal language still remains in active use.

== Notable Atayal people ==
- Esther Huang, actress and singer
- Jane Huang, singer of rock duo Y2J
- Joanne Tseng, actress and member of pop duo Sweety
- Kao Chin Su-mei, actress, singer and politician
- Laha Mebow, director, screenwriter, TV producer
- Landy Wen, singer
- Lo Chih-an, football player
- Lo Chih-en, football player
- Payen Talu, member of Legislative Yuan (1996–2002)
- Vic Chou, actor and member of pop group F4
- Vivian Hsu, actress
- Walis Nokan, writer.
- Yuming Lai, singer of rock duo Y2J
- Yeh Shuhua, singer of K-pop group (G)I-DLE - half Atayal on maternal side
- Jerry Yan, actor and member of pop group F4
- Yuma Taru, weaver and dyer

== See also ==
- Atayal Life Museum
- Atayal Resort
- Wulai Atayal Museum
- Taiwanese Indigenous peoples
