= Ju-jitsu at the 2009 World Games – Women's fighting −70 kg =

Ju-jitsu women's fighting −70 kg at the 2009 World Games
- Venue: National Sun Yat-Sen University Gymnasium, Kaohsiung, Taiwan
- Dates: 22 July 2009
- Competitors: 8 from 8 nations

Medalists
gold medal	(France) Mélanie Lavis
silver medal	(Netherlands) Lindsay Wyatt
bronze medal	(Germany) Sonja Kinz

The women's fighting −70 kg competition in ju-jitsu at the 2009 World Games took place on 22 July 2009 at the National Sun Yat-Sen University Gymnasium in Kaohsiung, Taiwan.

== Competition format ==
A total of 8 athletes entered the competition. They fought in stepladder system.

== Results ==
=== Gold medal bracket ===
Quarterfinals
(Italy) Laura Boco (ITA)	L
(Netherlands) Lindsay Wyatt (NED)	W
(Israel) Keshet Ofer (ISR)	L
(Germany) Sonja Kinz (GER)	W
(Russia) Alexandra Ivanova (RUS)	W
(Kazakhstan) Akzharkyn Baiturbayeva (KAZ)	L
(France) Mélanie Lavis (FRA)	W
(Denmark) Jeanne Rasmussen (DEN)	L

Semifinals
(Netherlands) Lindsay Wyatt (NED)	W
(Germany) Sonja Kinz (GER)	L
(Russia) Alexandra Ivanova (RUS)	L
(France) Mélanie Lavis (FRA)	W

Final
(Netherlands) Lindsay Wyatt (NED)	L
(France) Mélanie Lavis (FRA)	W

=== Bronze medal bracket ===
Quarterfinals
(Italy) Laura Boco (ITA)	W
(Israel) Keshet Ofer (ISR)	L
(Kazakhstan) Akzharkyn Baiturbayeva (KAZ)	L
(Denmark) Jeanne Rasmussen (DEN)	W

Semifinals
(Italy) Laura Boco (ITA)	L
(Russia) Alexandra Ivanova (RUS)	W
(Denmark) Jeanne Rasmussen (DEN)	L
(Germany) Sonja Kinz (GER)	W

Final
(Russia) Alexandra Ivanova (RUS)	L
(Germany) Sonja Kinz (GER)	W
