= JTU =

JTU may refer to:

- Jackson Turbidity Unit
- Japan Teachers' Union
- Journeymen Tailors Union
- Jiao Tong University
