= Ju-jitsu at the 2009 World Games – Men's fighting −85 kg =

Ju-jitsu men's fighting −85 kg at the 2009 World Games
- Venue: National Sun Yat-Sen University Gymnasium, Kaohsiung, Taiwan
- Dates: 21 July 2009
- Competitors: 8 from 8 nations

Medalists
gold medal	(Germany) Andreas Kuhl
silver medal	(Russia) Dmitry Nebolsin
bronze medal	(Austria) Matthias Gastgeb

The men's fighting −85 kg competition in ju-jitsu at the 2009 World Games took place on 21 July 2009 at the National Sun Yat-Sen University Gymnasium in Kaohsiung, Taiwan.

== Competition format ==
A total of 8 athletes entered the competition. They fought in stepladder system.

== Results ==
=== Gold medal bracket ===
Quarterfinals
(Germany) Andreas Kuhl (GER)	W
(Israel) Amit Gal (ISR)	L
(Netherlands) Gertjan Hofland (NED)	W
(France) Franck Vatan (FRA)	L
(Austria) Matthias Gastgeb (AUT)	W
(Belgium) Willy Dupont (BEL)	L
(Denmark) Danny Mathiassen (DEN)	L
(Russia) Dmitry Nobolsin (RUS)	W

Semifinals
(Germany) Andreas Kuhl (GER)	W
(Netherlands) Gertjan Hofland (NED)	L
(Austria) Matthias Gastgeb (AUT)	L
(Russia) Dmitry Nobolsin (RUS)	W

Final
(Germany) Andreas Kuhl (GER)	W
(Russia) Dmitry Nobolsin (RUS)	L

=== Bronze medal bracket ===
Quarterfinals
(Israel) Amit Gal (ISR)	L
(France) Franck Vatan (FRA)	W
(Belgium) Willy Dupont (BEL)	W
(Denmark) Danny Mathiassen (DEN)	L

Semifinals
(France) Franck Vatan (FRA)	L
(Austria) Matthias Gastgeb (AUT)	W
(Belgium) Willy Dupont (BEL)	L
(Netherlands) Gertjan Hofland (NED)	W

Final
(Austria) Matthias Gastgeb (AUT)	W
(Netherlands) Gertjan Hofland (NED)	L
