= Hamasen =

Urban area in Kaohsiung, Taiwan

- Traditional Chinese: 哈瑪星
- Simplified Chinese: 哈玛星
Transcriptions
Standard Mandarin
- Hanyu Pinyin: Hāmǎxīng
- Tongyong Pinyin: Hāmǎsīng
Southern Min
- Hokkien POJ: Há-má-seng

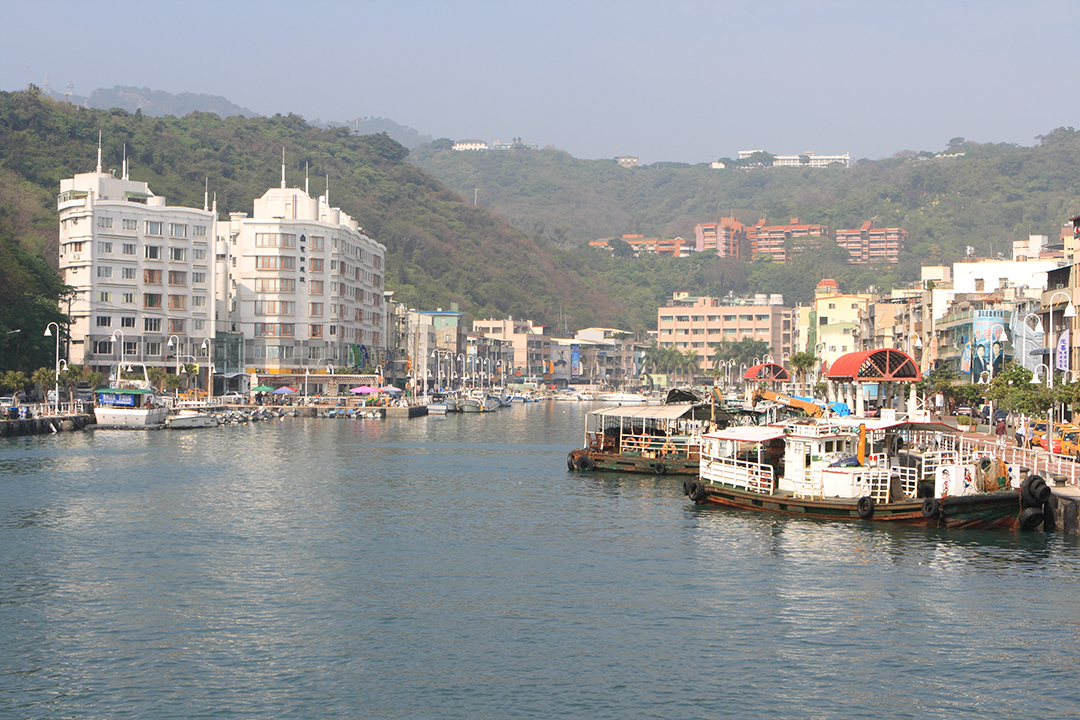
A view of Hamasen from Kaohsiung Harbor

Hamasing (Chinese: 哈瑪星; pinyin: Hāmǎxīng) or Hamasen (濱線) is a historic urban area of Kaohsiung, Taiwan. It is located in the southern end of Gushan District between the foot of Ape Hill and Yancheng District, another historic quarter.

== History ==
The name Hamasing was derived from Japanese "Hamasen (濱線)", meaning "beach railway line", this being the Japanese name of two railways which passed through this area. It used to be the hub for railway and ocean cargo. It was the center of politics, economy, and fishing industry. The area also was the pioneer of modernization of Kaohsiung where the first modernized city street, tap water installation, electricity and lamps were made there. Before the establishment of Kaohsiung Station, Hamasing was a regular stop for passenger trains.

== Transportation ==
Hamasen has a wharf named Gushan Ferry Station which connects Gushan District and Cijin Island with regular ferry service via the Cijin–Gushan Ferry. Additionally, many small fishing boats and yachts also berth there. Hamasen Station of the Kaohsiung MRT is located in this area. A pedestrian and cycling tunnel through Ape Hill connects Hamasing and National Sun Yat-sen University in Sizihwan.
