= Liu Chun-hsiung =

Taiwanese politician

Liu Chun-hsiung (Chinese: 劉俊雄; born 1951) is a Taiwanese politician.

== Early life and education ==
Liu was born in 1951. He studied business at National Sun Yat-sen University.

== Political career ==
Liu was director of the Kaohsiung branch of the Democratic Progressive Party, and served on the DPP central committee. He was elected to two terms on the Legislative Yuan via the party list, serving from 1999 to 2005. In December 2000, Liu and fellow legislator Hsu Chih-ming jointly hosted a press conference, calling for an incinerator operated by Sunny Friend Environmental Technology Company in Meinong District to be shut down. In February 2002, both legislators objected to the selection of You Ching, a fellow Democratic Progressive Party member, as a convenor of the legislature's judiciary committee. During a legislative interpellation session in 2003, regarding legal matters relating to the 2002 election for the Kaohsiung City Council speakership, Liu and Su Ying-kuei argued after Su implied that Liu should be investigated as a suspect in the case. After stepping down from the Legislative Yuan, Liu mounted an unsuccessful campaign for a seat on the Kaohsiung City Council in December 2006.
