= Sizihwan Tunnel =

Tunnel in Gushan, Kaohsiung, Taiwan

Sizihwan Tunnel (Kotobuki-yama Tunnel)
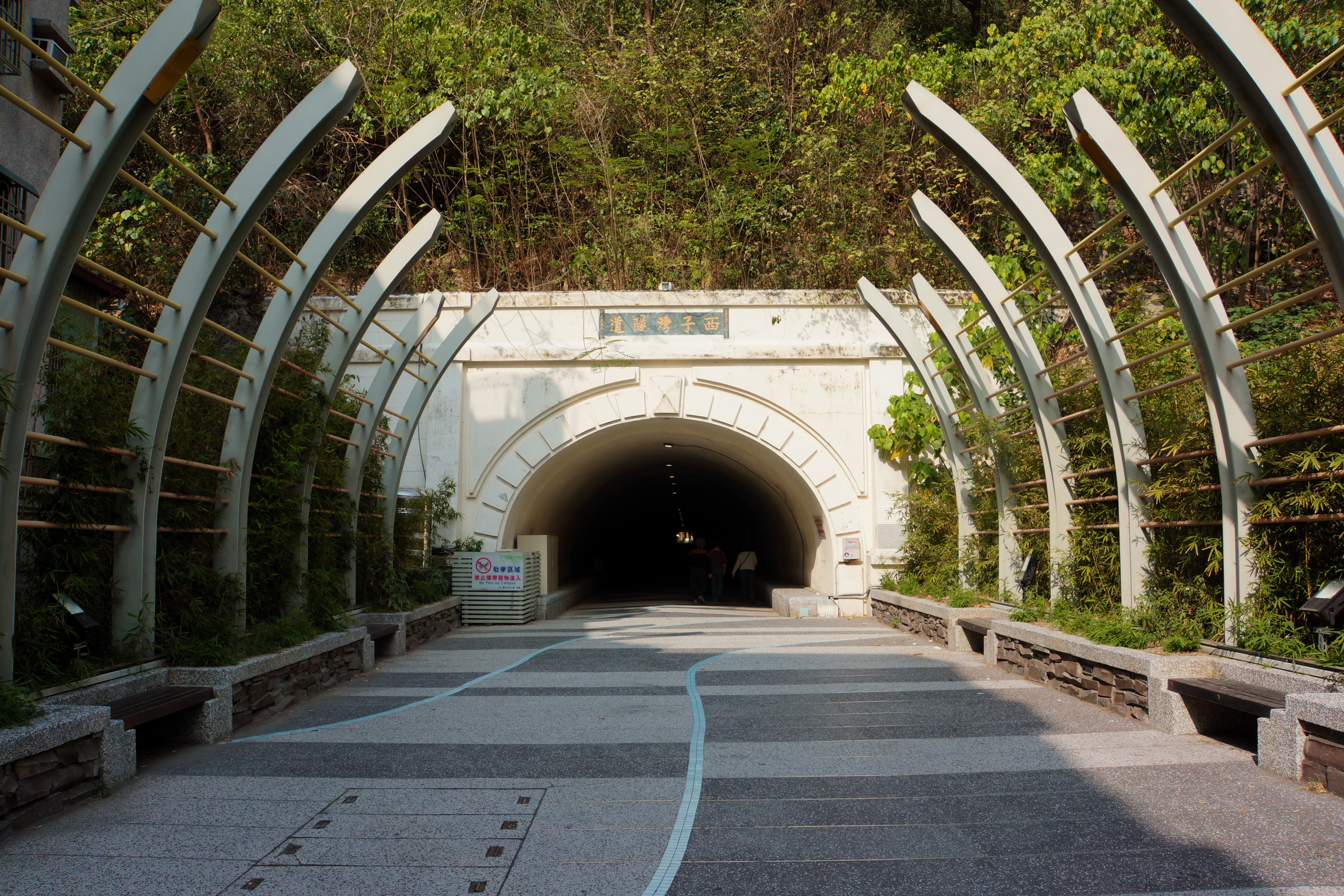
- Interactive map of Sizihwan Tunnel (Kotobuki-yama Tunnel)

Overview
- Official name: 西子灣隧道
- Location: Gushan, Kaohsiung, Taiwan
- Coordinates: 22°37′27.8″N 120°16′10.1″E

Operation
- Work began: 1927
- Opened: 1933
- Reopened: 11 November 2017

Technical
- Length: 260 m (850 ft)
- Tunnel clearance: 3.6 m (12 ft)
- Width: 6 m (20 ft)

The Sizihwan Tunnel (traditional Chinese: 西子灣隧道; simplified Chinese: 西子湾隧道; pinyin: Xīzǐwān Suìdào) is a tunnel in Gushan District, Kaohsiung, Taiwan. It links National Sun Yat-sen University and Linhai Road in Hamasen.

== History ==
=== Empire of Japan ===
The tunnel was originally built by the Japanese as part of the infrastructure project for Kotobuki-yama Park. The work started in 1927 with the excavation work led by Sanjiro Umino. The work was completed a year later in 1928 and the tunnel started to be used in 1933 as Kotobuki-yama Tunnel. During World War II, the tunnel was used as shelter for protection from the United States bombing raid. The secret section of the tunnel was used by the Japanese as the combat command center which had a projection to all directions.

=== Republic of China ===
The Kaohsiung City Government renovated the middle section of the tunnel in 1990-1991. On 9 April 2004, the tunnel was declared a historical monument by the city government. In 2008, the tunnel entrance was demolished. In 2017, a section of the tunnel underwent renovation and the front section underwent landscaping works. The tunnel was officially opened to the public on 11 November 2017 in conjunction with the 30th anniversary of National Sun Yat-sen University. The renovation work was part of the Hsing Pin Plan city restoration work. It was decorated with lights and projected images.

== Architecture ==
The tunnel is 260 meters long, 6 meters wide and 3.6 meters high. It consists of three sections, which are the front, middle and rear sections. Both of the tunnel two entrances are arch-shaped concrete-made rocks. The newly opened secret section of the tunnel has a U shape and is 100 meters long, able to accommodate up to 2,150 people at once. It has bathroom, dormitory, electricity, ventilation system and water supply source.

== Transportation ==
The tunnel is accessible within walking distance northwest of Sizihwan Station of Kaohsiung MRT.

== See also ==
- List of tourist attractions in Taiwan
