= Yuei-An Liou =

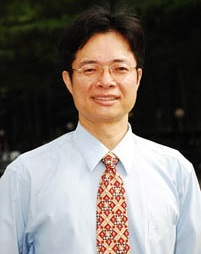
- Personal Information
- Born: December 25, 1963 (age 62); Yunlin, Taiwan
- Education: National Sun Yat-sen University (BS, 1987); University of Michigan (MS, 1992, 1994; PhD, 1996)
- Occupations: Space and Remote Sensing Chair Professor and Academician
- Known for: Remote Sensing, GNSS Meteorology, Hydrometeorology, Atmospheric Science, Drought, Heat Stress, Tropical Cyclone

Yuei-An Liou (Chinese: 劉說安) is a Taiwanese Space and Remote Sensing scientist. He is a Chair Professor at National Central University (NCU) and serves at the Center for Space and Remote Sensing Research (CSRSR).

Liou is an Academician of the International Academy of Astronautics (IAA) and a Foreign Member of the Russian Academy of Engineering. He is also a Fellow of The Institution of Engineering and Technology (IET). In recognition of his scientific impact and citation influence, he has been listed among the World’s Top 2% Scientists by Stanford University since 2020.

== Education ==
- B.S., 1987: Electrical Engineering, National Sun Yat-sen University, Taiwan (June 1987)
- M.S.E., 1992: Electrical Engineering, University of Michigan, Ann Arbor, USA (May 1992)
- M.S., 1994: Atmospheric and Space Sciences, University of Michigan (April 1994)
- Ph.D., 1996: Electrical Engineering and Atmospheric, Oceanic, and Space Sciences, University of Michigan, Ann Arbor, USA (August 1996)
- M.S. & Ph.D. Advisor: Anthony W. England , (Professor, University of Michigan; NASA Astronaut)

== Academic career ==
=== Academic positions ===
Liou has held numerous academic positions since 1996:

- Head, Taiwan and Global Drought Investigation and Research Center (NCU TGI), National Central University(2025–present)
- Space and Remote Sensing Chair Professor, Center for Space and Remote Sensing Research, National Central University (2025–present)
- Professor, Department of Business Administration, National Central University (2023–present)
- Professor, Center for Space and Remote Sensing Research, National Central University (2010–2025)
- Visiting NSC Fellow, Department of Hakka Language and Social Sciences, National Central University (2010–present)
- Professor, Department of Space Science & Engineering, National Central University (2001–present)
- Professor, Center for Space and Remote Sensing Research, National Central University (2001–present)
- Director, Center for Space and Remote Sensing Research, National Central University (2007–2010)
- Director, Master of Science Program in Remote Sensing Science and Technology, National Central University (2008–2010)
- Visiting NSC Fellow & Dean, College of Electrical Engineering & Computer Science, Ching Yun University (2006–2007)
- Visiting Research Fellow, Research Center for Environmental Changes, Academia Sinica (2006)
- Consultant/Section Chief, National Space Organization, NARSLabs (2005–2006)
- Professor, Graduate Institute of Hydrological and Oceanic Sciences, National Central University (2001–2005)
- Professor, Department of Electrical Engineering, National Central University (1996–2001)
- Associate Professor, Graduate Institute of Space Science, National Central University (1997–2001)
- Associate Professor, Center for Space and Remote Sensing Research, National Central University (1996–2001)
- Research Assistant, Electrical Engineering, University of Michigan-Ann Arbor (1991–1996)
- Research Assistant, Mechanical Engineering, National Taiwan University (1989–1990)

=== Professional memberships and leadership ===
- Founding President, Taiwan Group on Earth Observations(TGEO) Taiwan (2010–present)
- Honorary President, Vietnamese Experts Association in Taiwan and Vietnam (2016–present)
- President, Taiwan GIS Center (National Development Council think-tank) (2014–2016)
- Member of the Expert Board, Skolkovo Foundation, Russia (2014–present)
- Co-Chairman, Environmental Monitoring from Space of East Asia (EMSEA) (2006–present)
- Member, Working Group 7, Asia-Pacific Biodiversity Observation Network (AP BON, GEO) (2009–present)
- Member, COSPAR Task Group on the Group on Earth Observations (2013–present)
- Member, International Committee for IGMASS Project Implementation, Taiwan (2010–present)
- Senior Member, Institute of Electrical and Electronics Engineers (IEEE) (2001–present)

He has also served as an advisor to various governmental agencies, including the Public Construction Commission and Atomic Energy Council of the Executive Yuan of Taiwan. Liou serves on academic awards committees, including the Ministry of Education Yushan Scholar Program Committee and the Yuan-Tseh Lee Foundation for the Advancement of Outstanding Scholarship Outstanding Scholar Awards. He was also a nominator for the 2024 Kyoto Prize. From 2005 to 2006, he also served as Advisor and Division Director of the Science Research Division at the National Space Organization (NSPO), where he oversaw satellite missions and scientific research and development, including the FORMOSAT-3 space mission.

== Awards and honors ==
Liou has received numerous academic Honors and Awards throughout his Academic career:

- 2025: Space and Remote Sensing Chair Professor, National Central University
- 2024: Choen Kim Award, Korean Society of Remote Sensing,Korea
- 2024: National Central University Outstanding Paper Contribution Award
- 2023: Distinguished Lecture, Asia Oceania Geoscience Society (AOGS) Annual Meeting
- 2023: National Central University Outstanding Paper Contribution Award
- 2023: Distinguished Professor Award, National Central University
- 2023: Spotlight, Department of Atmospheric, Oceanic and Space Science, University of Michigan
- 2021: Honorary Chair Professor, National Marine Museum of Science and Technology, Ministry of Education
- 2021: Outstanding Award, Vietnam Economic and Cultural Office in Taipei,Taiwan
- 2020–present: Listed in the World's Top 2% Scientists by Stanford University
- 2019: Outstanding Research Award, Ministry of Science and Technology, Taiwan
- 2019: Crystal Achievement Award, Vietnam Academy of Science and Technology
- 2015: Fellow, The Institution of Engineering and Technology
- 2014: Member, International Academy of Astronautics (IAA)
- 2013: Chair Professor, Nanchang University, China
- 2013: Golden Heart Prize, Department of Electrical Engineering, National Sun Yat-sen University
- 2013: Distinguished Professor Award, National Central University
- 2012: Visiting Professor, Taylor’s School of Engineering, Malaysia
- 2010: Distinguished Professor Award, National Central University
- 2009: Academician (Corresponding Member), International Academy of Astronautics
- 2008: Outstanding Alumni Award, National Sun Yat-sen University
- 2008: Outstanding Alumni Award, University of Michigan Alumni Association in Taiwan
- 2008: Foreign Member, Prokhorov Academy of Engineering Sciences, Russian Federation
- 2007: Honorary Life Member, The Korean Society of Remote Sensing (KSRS),Korea
- 2007: Outstanding Research Award, National Central University
- 2006: Excellent Senior Professor, National Central University
- 2006: Chair Professor, Ching Yun University (now Chien Hsin University of Science and Technology)
- 2006: Contribution Award to FORMOSAT-3 National Space Mission, National Space Organization
- 2005–2006: The First Class Research Award, National Science Council (NSC)
- 2005: Listed in Marquis Who's Who in Science and Engineering
- 2004: Outstanding Research Award, National Central University
- 2004: Listed in Who’s Who in Electromagnetics
- 2003: Outstanding Research Award Candidate, National Science Council (Atmospheric Science)

== Research contributions ==
=== Academic output and rankings ===
From 1996, Liou published more than 204 research papers, including 182 articles indexed in the Science Citation Index (SCI). He served as the corresponding author for 143 of these publications. His cumulative Impact Factor (IF) is reported at 908.144. Citation metrics indicate his work has been widely referenced, with citation counts of 9,423 (CNG), 6,549 (CNS), and 4,716 (CNW). According to ScholarGPS rankings, Liou is ranked within the top 0.78% of scholars globally across all fields. His work holds significant standing in engineering and earth sciences, ranking in the top 0.5% for Remote sensing (0.41%) and Typhoon research (0.37%), and the top 1% for Global Positioning System (0.61%), Electrical and Computer Engineering (0.82%), and Machine learning (1.09%).

=== Disaster response and environmental monitoring ===
Liou's research applies remote sensing and satellite observation to international disaster response and environmental monitoring. His work frequently addresses hydrological extremes and climate-related hazards across the world. His research has contributed to international disaster response efforts, including analyzing satellite imagery for Tropical cyclones in Taiwan, the Philippines, and Vietnam, drought conditions in Ethiopia, India, Pakistan, urban heat island effects and heat stress in Vietnam and Taiwan, glacier in China, and many other regions include many Asian countries, Europe, United States, and Canada. Notable applications include analysis of the catastrophic flooding caused by Typhoon Morakot in 2009.

=== Mentorship ===
Liou supervises the Hydrology Remote Sensing Laboratory (HRSL) under the Center for Space and Remote Sensing Research, National Central University, where he has mentored numerous graduate students. Students under his supervision have received recognition at international scientific venues, including best paper awards at conferences such as the Asia Oceania Geosciences Society (AOGS).

=== Recent developments ===
Liou is working hard and published extensively in high-impact journals, focusing on the development of novel remote sensing indices for drought monitoring, global climate datasets, and urban environmental analysis. Notably, he developed the Relative Surface Evapotranspiration Index (RSETI) for drought characterization, published in Remote Sensing of Environment (2025), and the Surface Water Availability and Temperature (SWAT) index, published in IEEE Transactions on Geoscience and Remote Sensing (2023).
