= Sizihwan =

Place in Gushan, Kaohsiung, Taiwan

Sizihwan 西子灣
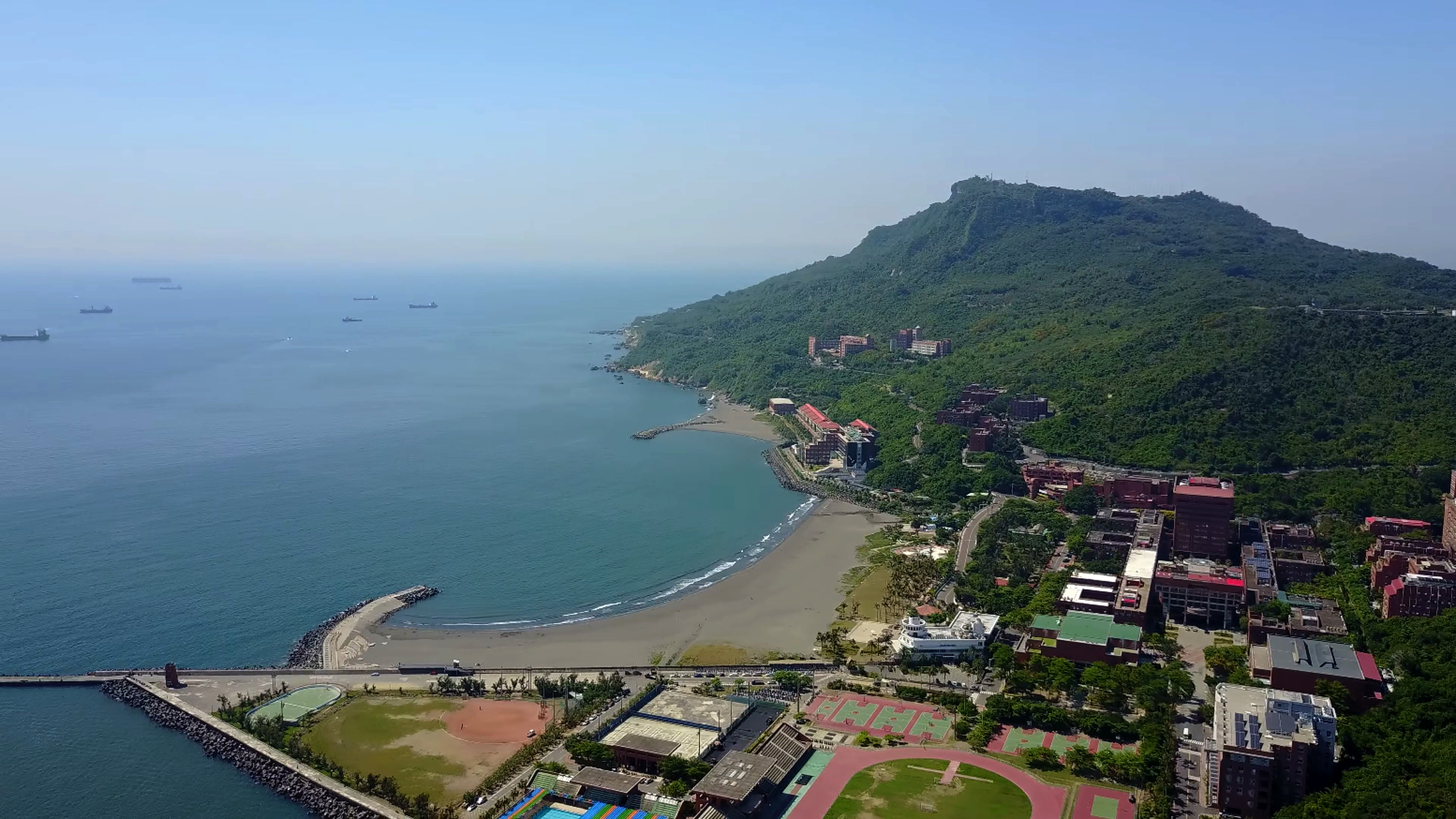

- Location within Kaohsiung
- Coordinates: 22.625809°N 120.264044°E
- Country: Taiwan
- Administrative divisions: Kaohsiung City

Sizihwan

Chinese name
- Traditional Chinese: 西子灣
Transcriptions
Standard Mandarin
- Hanyu Pinyin: Xīzǐwān
- Wade–Giles: Hsi^{1}-tzu^{3}-wan^{2}
- Tongyong Pinyin: Sizǐhwan
Hakka
- Romanization: Sî-chṳ́-vân

Alternative Chinese name
- Traditional Chinese: 西仔灣
Transcriptions
Southern Min
- Hokkien POJ: Se-á-oân

Japanese name
- Kanji: 西子湾
Transcriptions
- Romanization: Seishiwan

Sizihwan (Chinese: 西子灣; Hanyu Pinyin: Xīzǐwān; Tongyong Pinyin: Sizǐhwan) is a community and sightseeing spot in Gushan District, Kaohsiung, Taiwan, named for the adjacent bay of the Taiwan Strait, also called Sizihwan.

== Names ==
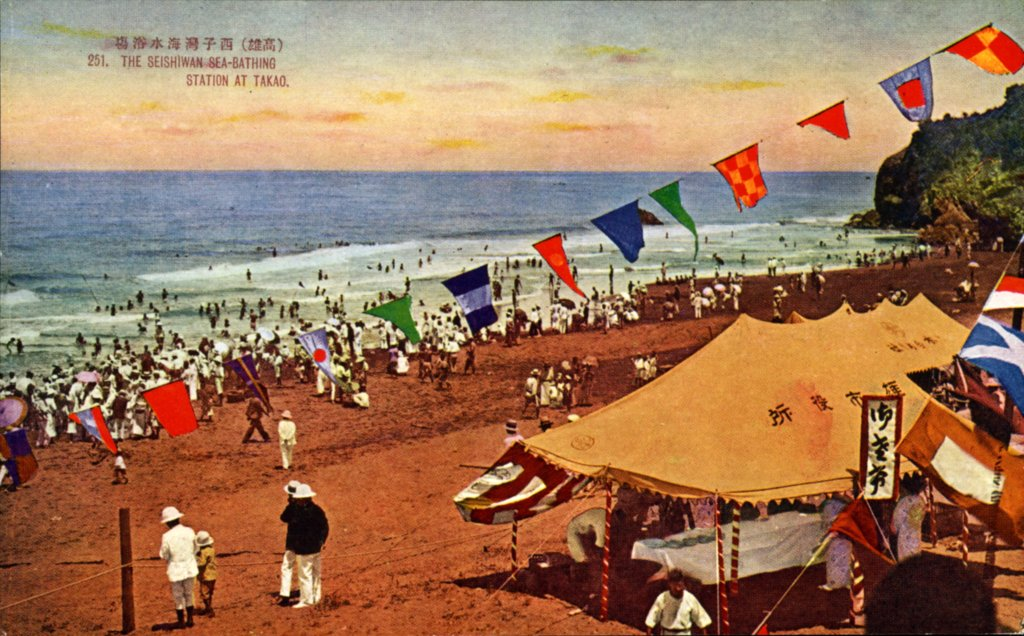
A postcard showing "Seishiwan", during Japanese rule of Taiwan

The name Sizih (西子) can also refer to Xi Shi, an alternative name used by the poet Su Dongpo of the Song dynasty referring to the famous ancient beauty, which somehow implies the view in this scenic area is as beautiful as the lady.

Historical names include:

- 洋路灣; Yánglùwān; Iûⁿ-lō͘-oan; 'ocean way bay'
- 洋子灣; Yángzǐwān, from Taiwanese Hokkien 洋仔灣; Iûⁿ-á-oan; 'ocean bay'
- 斜灣; Xiéwān, from 斜仔灣; Siâ-á-oan/Chhiâ-á-oan; 'sloping bay'

== Geography ==
Located on the Taiwan Strait at the north of the entrance to Kaohsiung Harbor, Sizihwan is surrounded by mountains with Shoushan to the northeast and Shaochuantou Hill (哨船頭山), a spur of Shoushan to the east. The area is dominated by the campus of National Sun Yat-sen University which faces the open waters of the Taiwan Strait. Sizihwan Beach (known as Takao Beach during Japanese rule) is a black sand beach that sits right at the edge of the campus and is a popular recreation area. The Former British Consulate at Takao and the historic Lingsing Temple at the peak of Shaochuantou overlook Sizihwan Bay.

== Transportation ==
Sizihwan is directly accessible by bicycle and on foot through the Sizihwan Tunnel (through Shaochuantou mountain). Built from 1927 to 1933, the tunnel is itself a tourist attraction. Larger vehicular traffic can reach the area by two other more circuitous routes around the mountain. Public bus service to the area is available from G-Bus #99 and O1(橘1) metro shuttle bus . The nearest Kaohsiung Mass Rapid Transit station is the Orange Line's terminus at Hamasen station which was known as Sizihwan station until it was renamed in 2024 to better reflect its location.

== Photo gallery ==
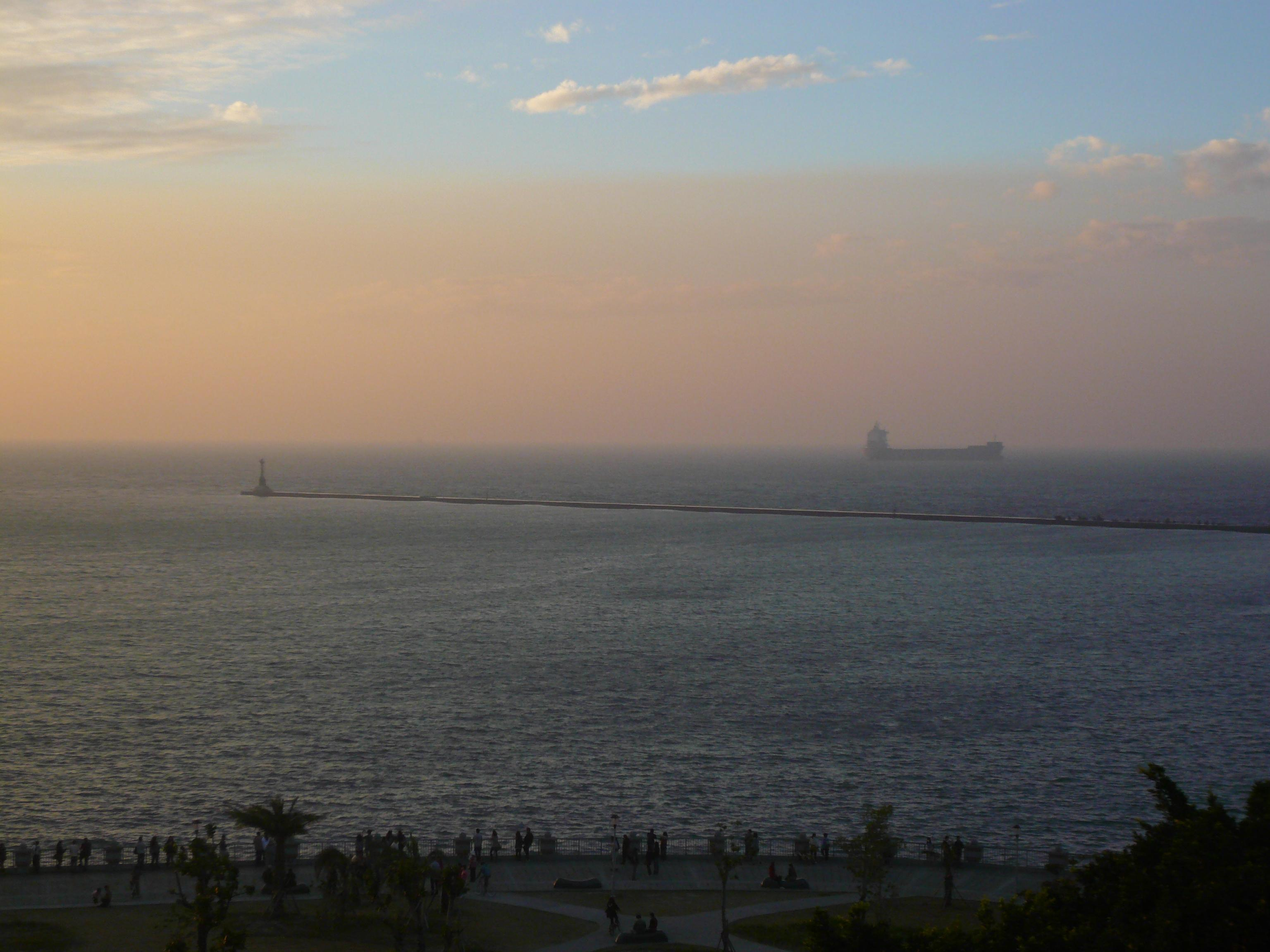
Sizihwan sunset

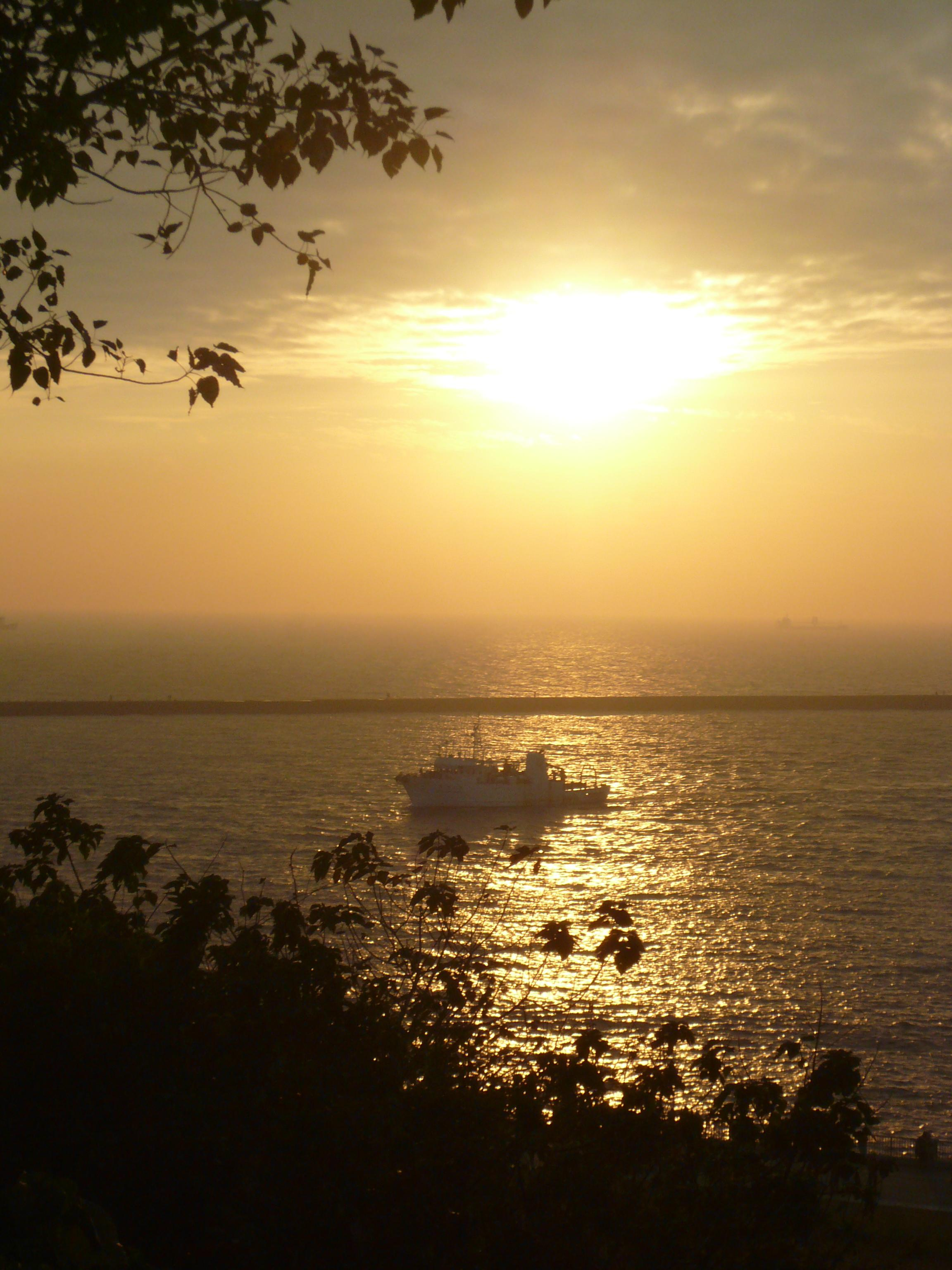
Sizihwan sunset

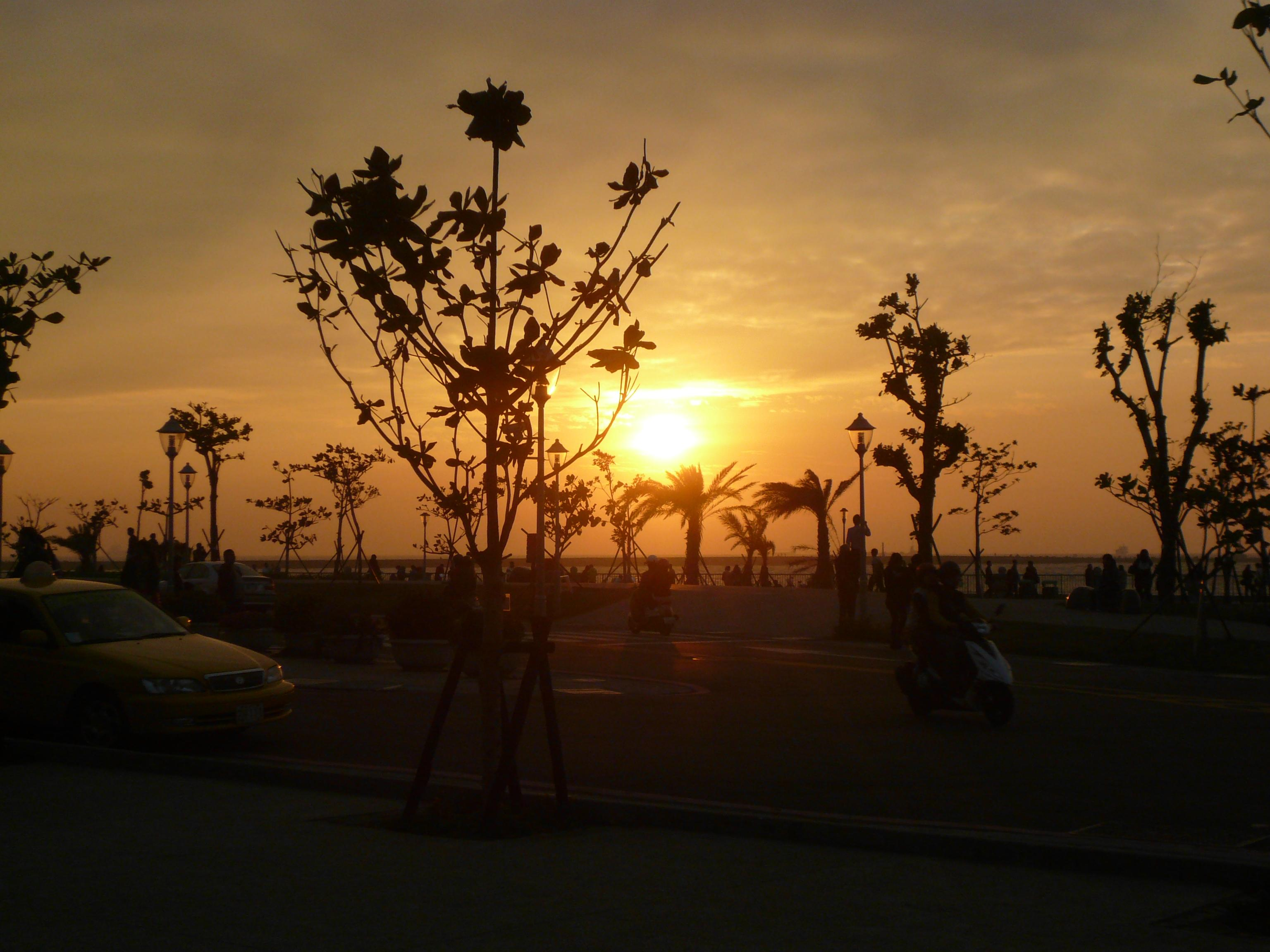
Sizihwan sunset

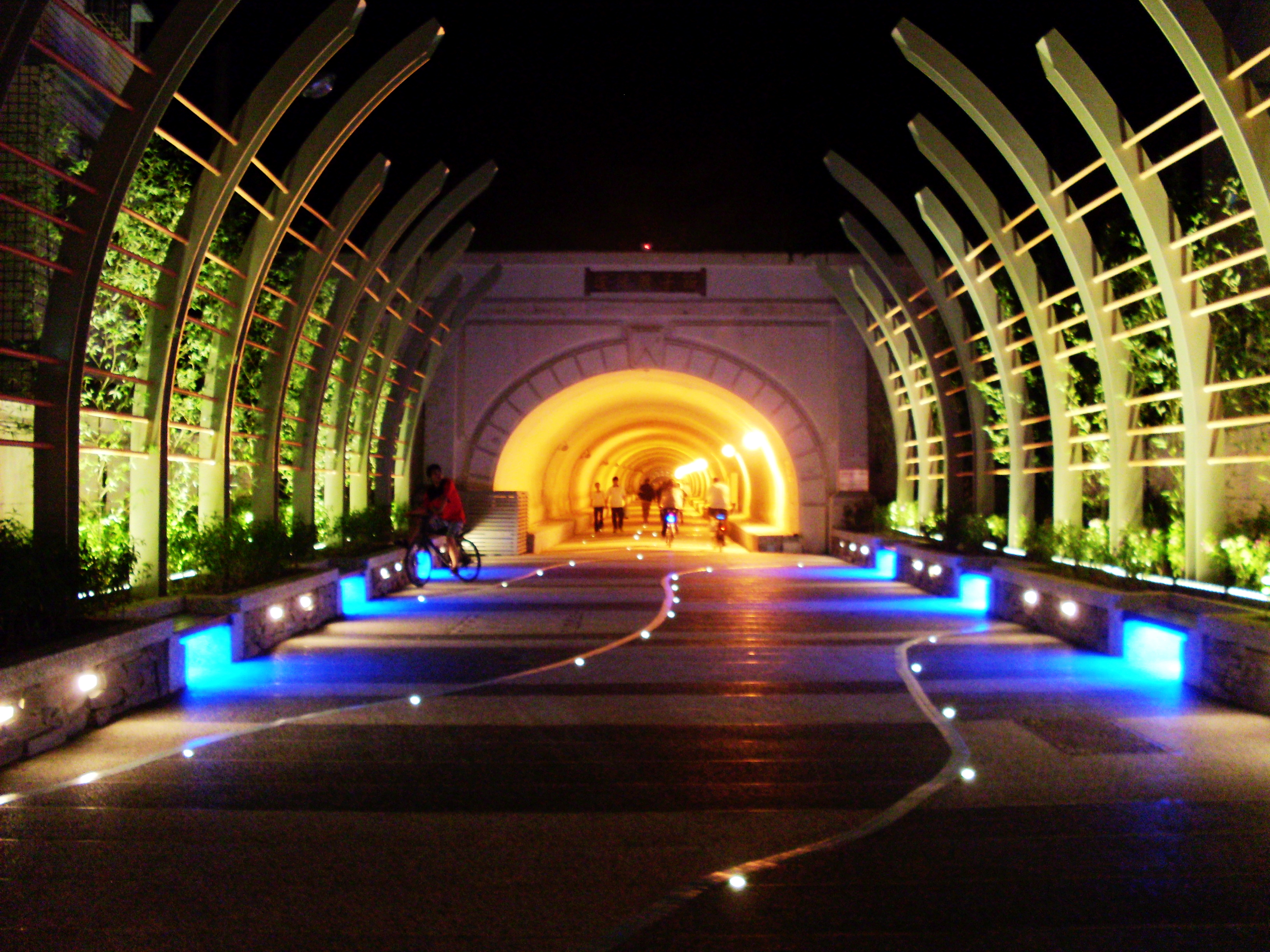
Sizihwan Tunnel entrance on the Sizihwan (west) side
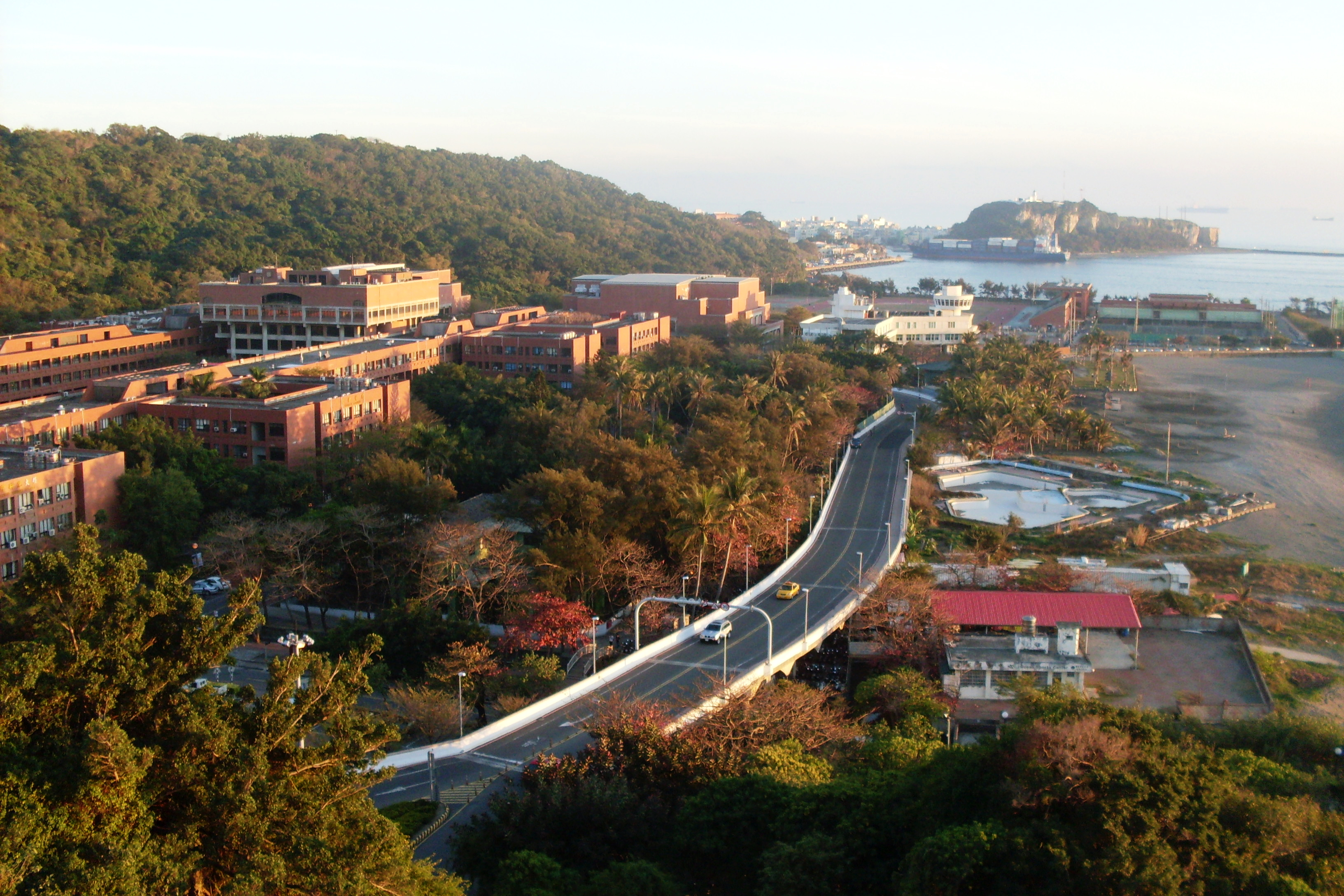
Sizihwan in the foreground with the black sand beach of Sizihwan Bay on the right, Lianhai Road in the middle, and buildings of National Sun Yat-sen University and Shoushan to the left; Qihou Mountain on Cijin lies beyond the entrance to Kaohsiung Harbor in the background

== See also ==
- Shoushan (Kaohsiung)
- Former British Consulate at Takao
- National Sun Yat-sen University
- Port of Kaohsiung
- Sizihwan Station
- Kaohsiung
