= Transport University =

Transport University may refer to:

- National Transport University
- St. Petersburg State Transport University
- Omsk State Transport University
- Siberian State Transport University

== See also ==
- Jiaotong University (disambiguation), literally Transport University
