= Chen Li-hui =

Taiwanese politician (born 1971)

Chen Li-hui (Chinese: 陳麗惠; born 18 December 1971) is a Taiwanese politician.

== Education ==
Chen graduated from Niao-Sung Primary School, Wen-Shan Junior High School, and Pu-Men High School, then studied administrative law at National Sun Yat-sen University, economics at Aichi University, and pursued a master's-level graduate program at the University of Kent.

== Political career ==
Chen began her political career on the Niaosong Township Council, and had been its chair.

Chen contested the 2001 legislative election and served on the fifth Legislative Yuan from 2002 to 2005, representing Kaohsiung County as a member of the Kuomintang. She voted against the wishes of her caucus for the offices of President and Vice President of the Legislative Yuan in February 2002, then voted to confirm Democratic Progressive Party nominee Yao Chia-wen as President of the Examination Yuan later in the same legislative session, leading to the KMT issuing an admonition of her and six others in June. During her tenure on the Legislative Yuan, Chen raised concerns about electronic and medical waste. She was considered supportive of Taiwanization. Chen was voted out of office in the 2004 legislative election.

Chen was seated to the National Assembly after winning the 2005 election.
