= Sun Yat-sen University (disambiguation) =

Sun Yat-sen University may refer to:

- Sun Yat-sen University (SYSU), a public university in Guangzhou, China
- National Sun Yat-sen University (NSYSU), a national research university in Kaohsiung, Taiwan

== Historically existed (1925–1930) ==
- Moscow Sun Yat-sen University, Soviet Union

== Renewed ==
- National 2nd Sun Yat-sen University, currently Wuhan University, China
- National 3rd Sun Yat-sen University, currently Zhejiang University, China
- National 4th Sun Yat-sen University, currently:
  - Nanjing University, Nanjing, China, which was further divided into and evolved into the following institutions during and after the 1952 re-organization:
    - Southeast University
    - Nanjing Normal University
    - Hohai University
    - Nanjing Agricultural University
    - Northwestern Polytechnical University
    - Air Force Medical University
  - National Central University, Taoyuan, Taiwan
- National 5th Sun Yat-sen University, currently Henan University, China
- National Lanchow Sun Yat-sen University, currently Lanzhou University, China
- National Sian (Xi'an) Sun Yat-sen University, currently Northwest University in Xi'an, China

== See also ==
- Jiaotong University (disambiguation)
