= National Sun Yat-sen University =

University in Sizihwan, Kaohsiung, Taiwan

Coordinates: 22°37′36″N 120°15′57″E

- 國立中山大學 (Chinese)
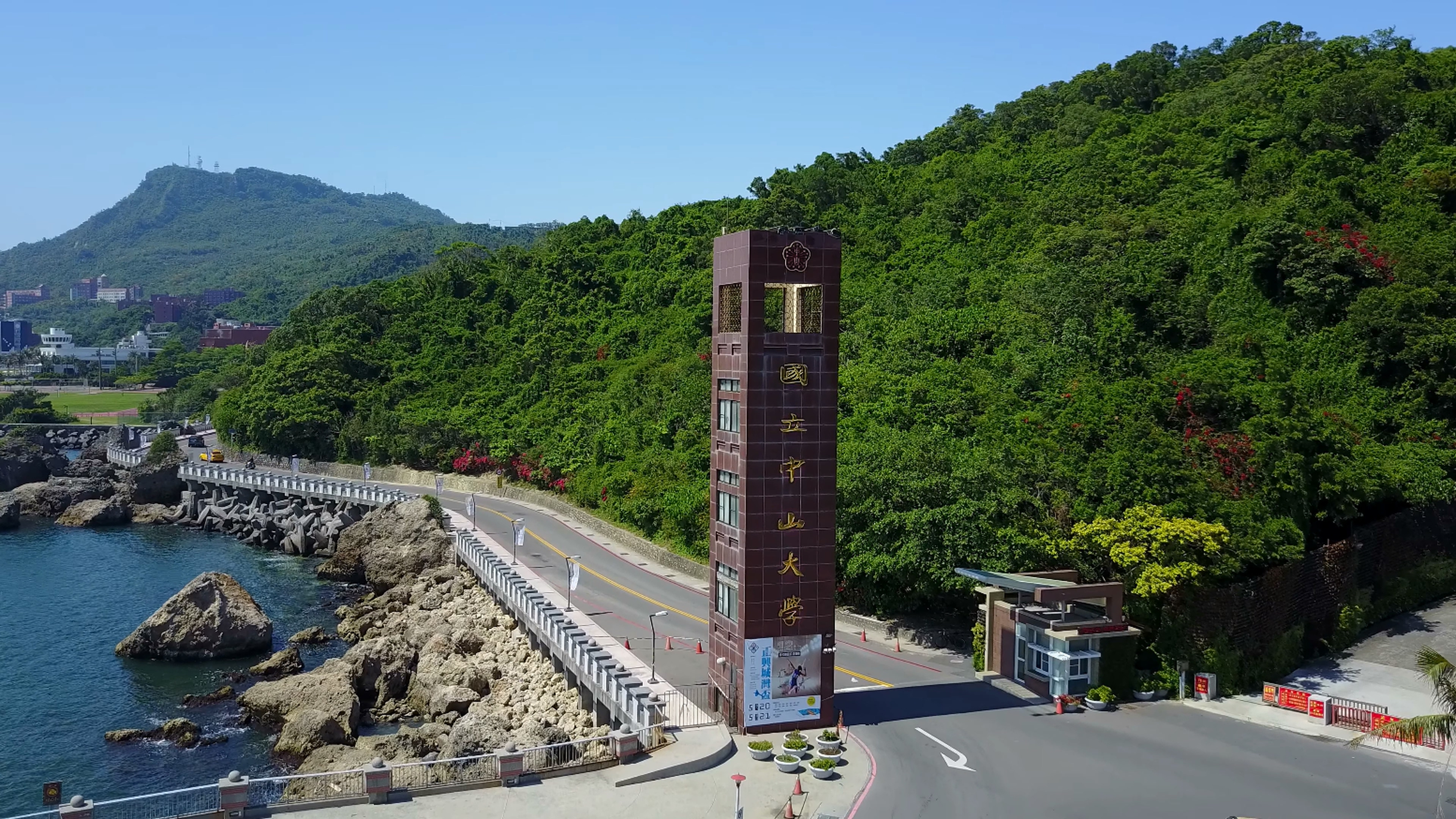
- The main entrance of NSYSU
- Motto: 博學、審問、慎思、明辨、篤行
- Motto in English: Erudite, Interrogated, Deliberate, Discerning, and Persistent (taken from the Doctrine of the Mean)
- Type: Public, Research
- Established: Founded 1924; Reestablished November 12, 1980
- Affiliations: AACSB-Accredited; APAIE; AAPBS; CFA; EUTW; PACIBER; Taiwan Comprehensive University System
- President: Chih-Peng Li
- Faculty: 614 full-time, 175 part-time
- Undergraduates: 5,040
- Postgraduates: 5,306
- Location: Gushan District, Lingya District, Renwu District, Kaohsiung, Taiwan
- Campus: Urban
- Website: nsysu.edu.tw

Chinese name
- Traditional Chinese: 國立中山大學
Transcriptions
Standard Mandarin
- Hanyu Pinyin: Guólì Zhōngshān Dàxué
- Wade–Giles: Kuoli Chungshan Tahsüeh
Southern Min
- Hokkien POJ: Kok-li̍p-tiong-san-tāi-ha̍k

National Sun Yat-sen University (NSYSU; Chinese: 國立中山大學; Pe̍h-ōe-jī: Kok-li̍p-tiong-san-tāi-ha̍k) is a public research university located in Sizihwan, Kaohsiung, Taiwan. Recognized as one of six Designated National Research Universities, NSYSU is also the only university in Taiwan to host National Key Institutions in both semiconductor technology and international finance. It is a core member of the TCUS, a research alliance partnered with Germany’s TU9.

The university holds AACSB and CFA Institute accreditation for business and finance. NSYSU maintains a particularly close academic relationship with the University of California, San Diego, the University of Osaka, and Ghent University, as part of a network of four research-intensive universities in major port cities.

== History ==
=== Founding ===
In 1923, two years before his death, the Founding Father of the Republic of China (ROC), Dr. Sun Yat-sen, established two universities, one civil and one military. The civil university was National Kwangtung University (國立廣東大學, renamed National Sun Yat-sen University in 1926), and the military university was Whampoa Military Academy. Both universities generated remarkable contributions and played an important education role in modern Chinese history.

After National Sun Yat-sen University was established in Canton, it was forced south due to the Sino-Japanese War. The university moved first to Yunnan, and later to North Guangdong. Finally, in 1945, the university resumed operations at its original campus in Canton.

In 1949, the government of the Republic of China moved to Taiwan; its alumni relocated accordingly.

=== Reestablishment ===
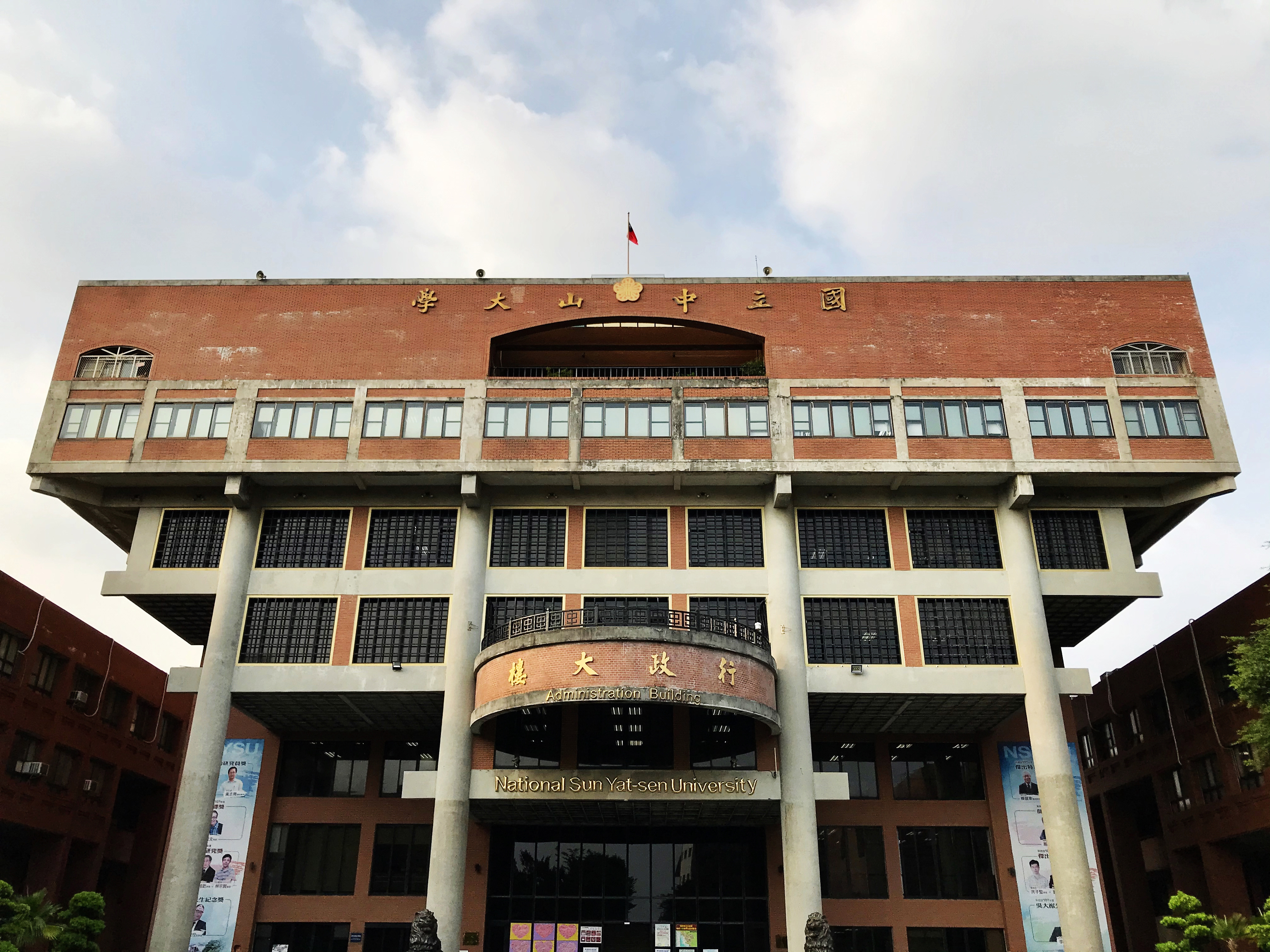
Administration Building

In the 1970s, as Taiwan's overall economic development took off, a phenomenon referred to as the Taiwan Miracle, the community's concern and attention to higher education grew. To balance the development of education in the north and south, the Taiwanese government decided to build a comprehensive university in the south.

In 1980, after Chiang Ching-kuo, the president of Taiwan and an alumnus of Moscow Sun Yat-sen University in USSR, personally approved the campus design under the leadership of Dr. Lee Huan (who later served as the Premier and Minister of Education), the university was established in Sizihwan, Kaohsiung City, the second largest metropolitan area in Taiwan.

Prior to establishing the new university, government officials visited the United States and Japan and strategically decided that NSYSU would focus on graduate schools, modeling it after the advanced technology of California Institute of Technology (Caltech) and the building construction methods of the University of California, San Diego (UCSD), which was designed to resist sea wind erosion. The system of the University of Tsukuba was introduced for the management of university library.

In its first two decades, NSYSU, similar to the other Sun Yat-sen universities, maintained a nationalist style and mission (中山大學模式) based-on Dr. Sun Yat-sen's philosophy.

=== Development ===
When NSYSU was re-established, the university had four departments, two graduate institutes, and 189 students. In 2002, NSYSU was named by the Ministry of Education as one of the country's seven major research-intensive universities. Two years later, the College of Management became the nation's first Association to Advance Collegiate Schools of Business (AACSB) accredited public university. In addition, NSYSU received a first/second stage grant from the "Aim for the Top University Plan" from the Ministry of Education in 2011 and 2016.

Since 2012, NSYSU has held the "NSYSU & UCSD Joint Symposium" on international academic cooperation. In the final two months of 2014, Nobel laureates Akira Suzuki and Hiroshi Amano visited the university.

In 2024, NSYSU has been chosen by the Ministry of Education as one of Taiwan's four landmark bilingual universities.

At present, NSYSU has 10 colleges, namely Liberal Arts, Sciences, Engineering, Management, Marine Sciences, Social Sciences, Si-Wan, Medicine, Semiconductor and Advanced Technology Research, and International Finance. These colleges have more than 10,000 students.

== Campus culture ==
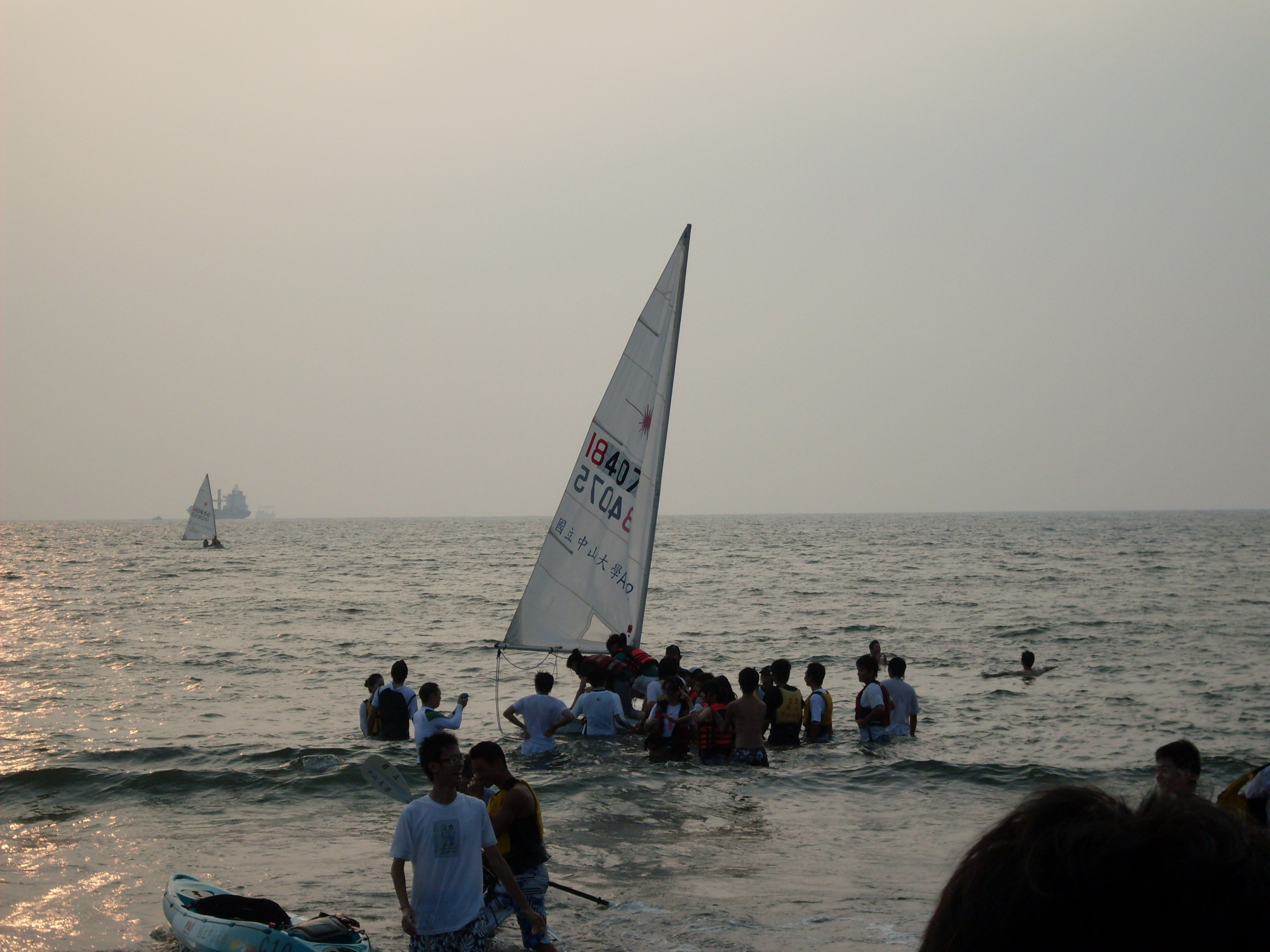
NSYSU Windsurfing Club

National Sun Yat-sen University is located in Kaohsiung City, the largest port city of Taiwan. Based on an academic style that emphasizes ocean and commerce, it not only is the birthplace of Taiwan's first college of maritime sciences but also is unique in hosting water sports activities directly on campus. Uniquely, NSYSU's graduation requirements for its students include demonstration of swimming ability. NSYSU also has a regular windsurfing competition relationship with the prestigious Osaka University in Japan.

Furthermore, NSYSU has a special sister school relationship with the University of California, San Diego (UCSD) in the United States, a research university with a similar academic style, and which similarly is located near a coast. The NSYSU & UCSD Joint Symposium has been held in Kaohsiung and La Jolla alternately every year since 2015.

The university is the birthplace of the first Sinophone bulletin board system (中山大學美麗之島) and popular Asian cultural terms "ACG". In addition, NSYSU will be transformed into an English-taught university by 2030.

== Campus and facilities ==
=== Campus ===
==== Sizihwan Campus ====
Located alongside the Kaohsiung Harbor and a military base, the NSYSU main campus is surrounded on three sides by mountains and also faces the open waters of the Taiwan Strait, thus making it a natural fortress. The Sizihwan beach (one of Eight Views of Taiwan) is located directly on campus which makes the university campus a very attractive location in Taiwan. The environmental characteristics are unique in the country, including the nature of the montane ecosystem, marine ecosystem, and coral reefs. In addition to the university buildings on the campus, there also is a seaside resort, a stadium constructed by land reclamation, Sizihwan Tunnel, and historic places remaining from the Japanese ruling era.

The campus is close to the downtown area but far away from congestion and noise of the city. There are only four roads connecting the campus to the outside city, all the lanes are close to the mountains and the sea, and the terrain is challenging. NSYSU faculty and students who residing on campus live amongst a variety of wildlife. There are a large number of Formosan rock macaques, cockatoos, Pallas's squirrels, and Reeves's muntjacs, and the campus area is rich in natural ecology. However, a near-daily occurrence involves macaques snatching food from students and breaking into dormitories and classrooms. In addition, the Sizihwan waters are inhabited by the endangered coral species Polycyanthus chiashanensis, with only about 50 remaining.

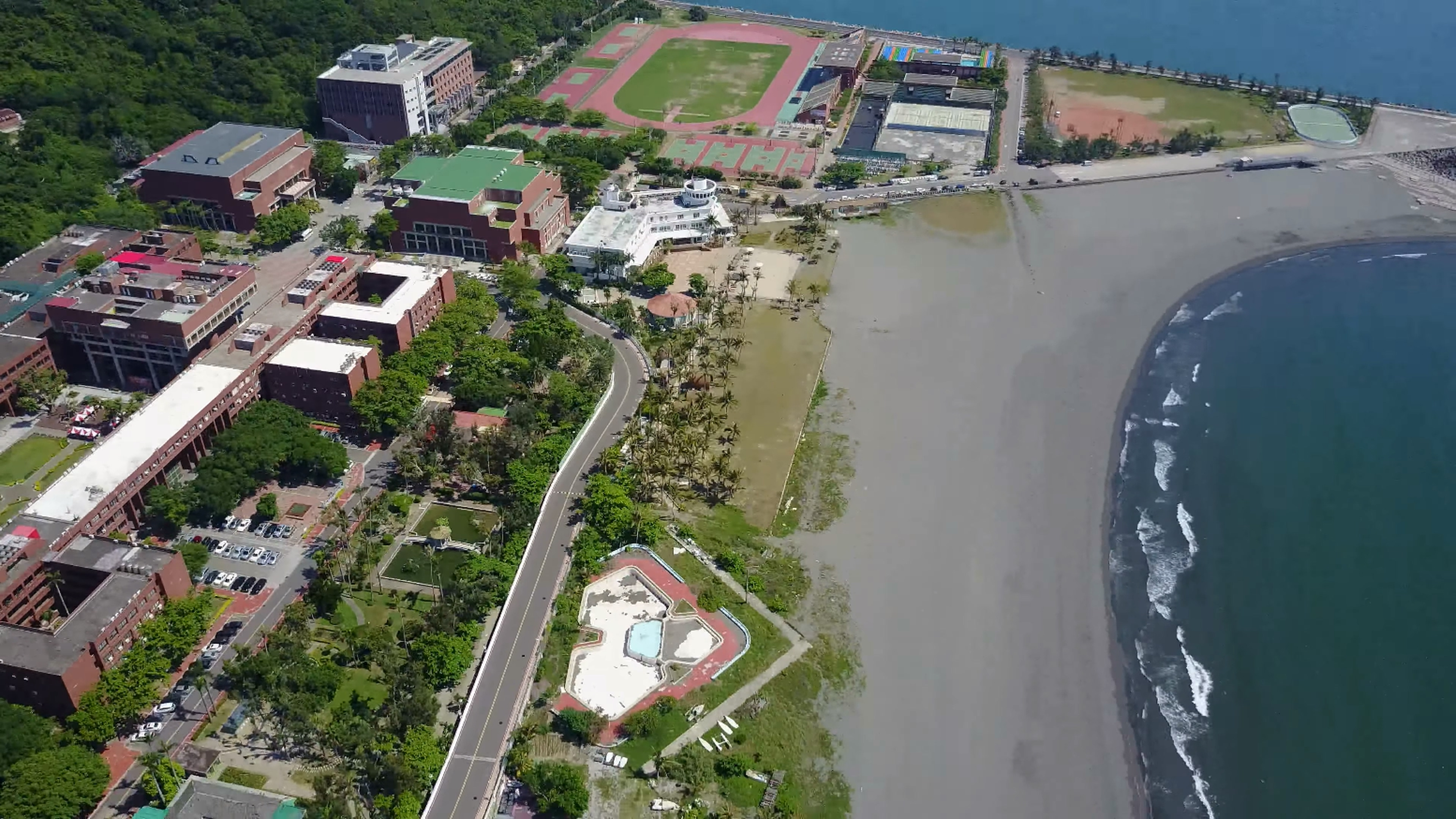
Campus buildings and Sizihwan Bay

==== Sizihwan historic places ====
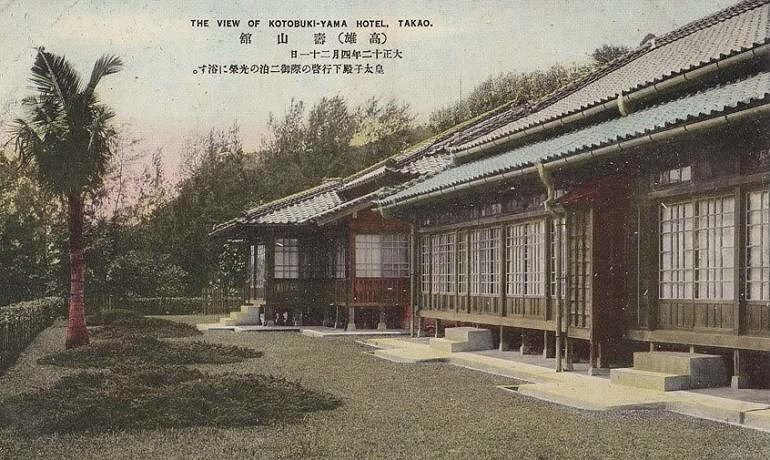
Takao Imperial Guesthouse before 1945

Imperial Guesthouse
From April 21 to 22, 1923, Prince Hirohito visited the Takao Port to inspect Kongō Maru. He lived in the Takao Mountain Guesthouse (打狗山賓館) a.k.a. Takao Imperial Guesthouse (高雄泊御所), which was newly-built. To celebrate the birthday of Prince Hirohito on April 29, Den Kenjirō, the Governor-General of Taiwan, renamed the Kotobuki-yama Hotel (寿山館). After the Government of the Republic of China took over Taiwan, Kotobuki-yama territory became a military control district, and then Guesthouse was dismantled. The site is now a dormitory for faculty and staff of National Sun Yat-sen University.
Sizihwan Tunnel
Sizihwan Tunnel was completed in October 1928, and at that time it was called Kotobuki-yama Do (寿山洞), connecting (at that time) Sizihwan and downtown Takao. Currently, it connects National Sun Yat-sen University and Hamasen.
Sizihwan Guesthouse of Chiang Kai-shek
In 1937, the Imperial Japanese Navy built a two-story building named Takao Sightseeing Hall (高雄観光館). After the R.O.C. government took over Taiwan, it became one of Guesthouses of Chiang Kai-shek. President Chiang Kai-shek and his madame lived at the Guesthouse each time they traveled to southern Taiwan. In 1980, the building was transferred to National Sun Yat-sen University, and in 1999 it was given another name, Sizihwan Art Gallery. In 2004, the gallery was designated as a Kaohsiung City Historic Site.

==== Renwu Campus ====
In 2022, NSYSU opened the Renwu campus, built on 24 hectares of land, with three areas of focus planned: AI medicine, intelligent health care, and ecological recreation. The campus will provide research space for the Institute of Precision Medicine, the Institute of Biotechnology and Medicine, the Institute of Medical Technology, and the Institute of Biomedical Research. In December 2020, this Campus completed 24 hectares of land preparation operations, including base elevation adjustment, drainage facilities for detention ponds, tree clearing and greening, etc. The medical teaching building is planned to be a 1-floor underground building and 6-floor above ground building, covering an area of 3,160 pings.

Lingya Campus

The Lingya Campus is located in the center of Kaohsiung City. As of 2024, this campus is primarily used by NSYSU's school of Medicine and is under construction.

=== Pratas Island ===
In 2012 NSYSU Dongsha Atoll Research Station (DARS) was established for biology, biogeochemistry, and oceanography research.

=== Overseas research center ===
==== Baltic States ====
NSYSU and University of Latvia have had a successful scientific cooperation for years. The joint team jointly established the Taiwan and Baltic States Physics Research Center (TBRCP), which aims to specialize in physics.

==== Sri Lanka ====
The Taiwan and Sri Lanka Environmental Change Sciences and Technology Innovation Center (TS/ECSTIC) is located in Sri Lanka. The Western Long-term Observation Station is located at the University of Sri Jayewardenepura in the capital; the Southern Long-term Observation Station is located at the University of Ruhuna in Matara.

==== Tuvalu ====
In cooperation with the government of Tuvalu, NSYSU establishes the Taiwan and Tuvalu Center on Marine Science and Engineering (TTCMSE).

== Academics ==
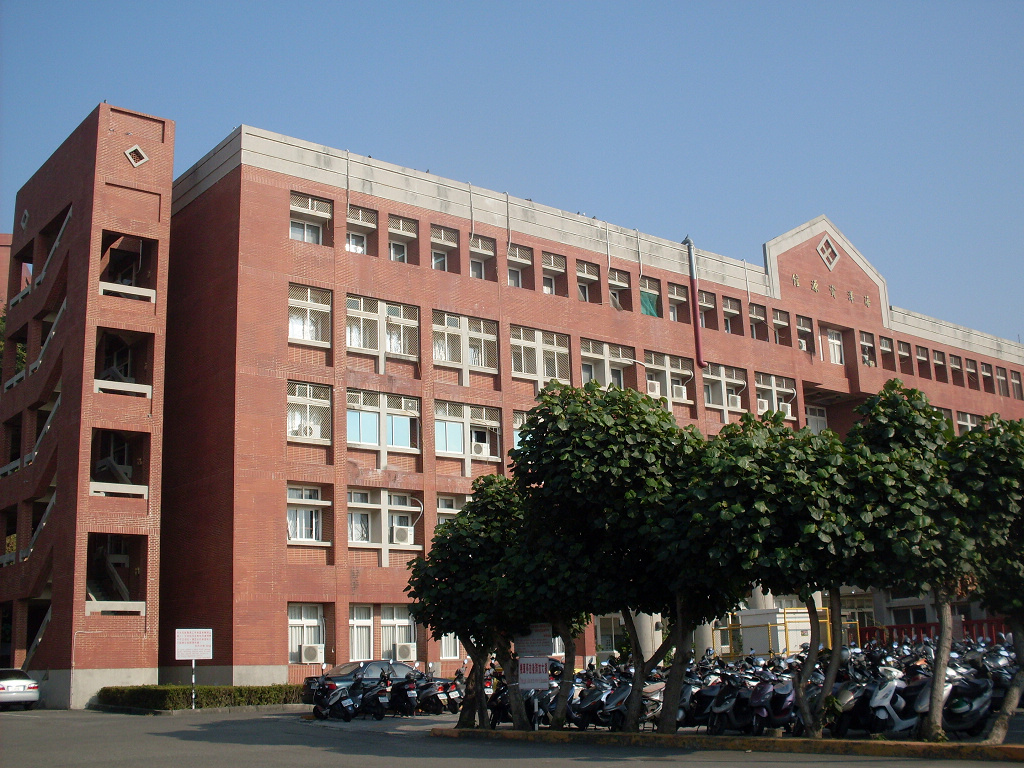
NSYSU College of Marine Sciences old building

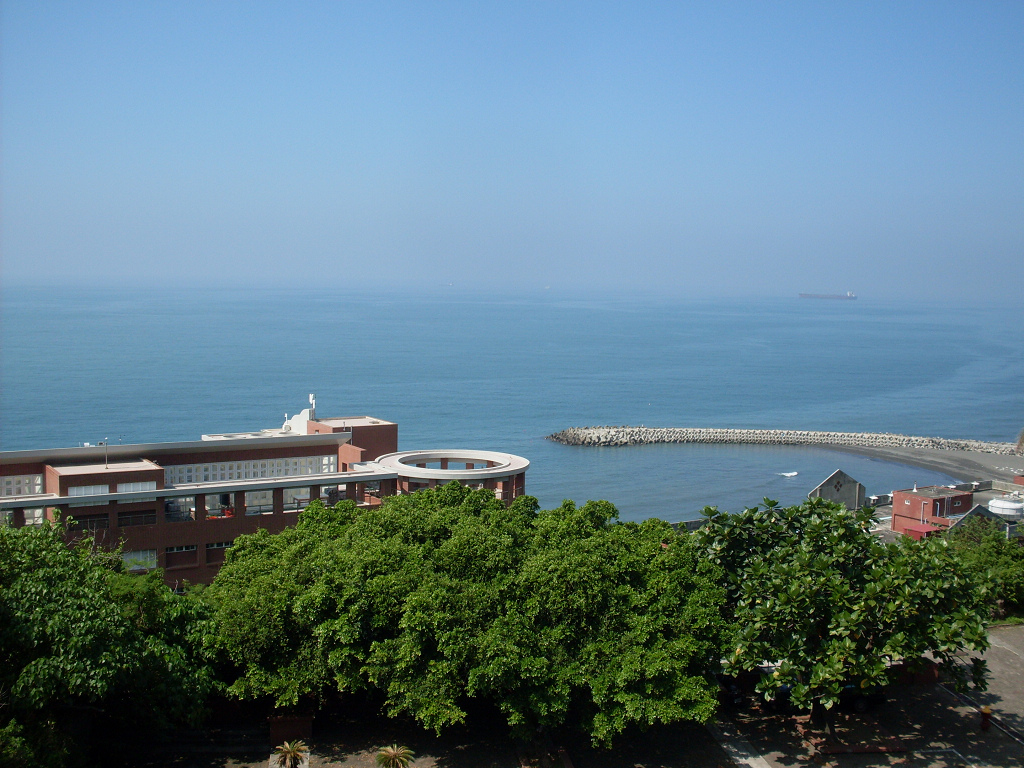
NSYSU College of Marine Sciences is adjacent to Taiwan Strait

=== Colleges ===
NSYSU has eight colleges:

- Engineering
- Liberal Arts
- Management
- Marine Sciences
- Medicine
- Science
- Social Sciences
- Si-Wan

==== National Key Fields Colleges ====
NSYSU has two National Key Fields colleges established based on the special decree National Key Fields Industry-University Cooperation and Skilled Personnel Training:

- College of Semiconductor and Advanced Technology Research
- School of International Finance (Located in 85 Sky Tower)

=== Research ===
Despite its small-to-medium size, National Sun Yat-sen University has substantial research capabilities. The "Asia Pacific Ocean Research Center" at NSYSU is a Kuroshio research center with advanced marine current power generation technology. The "Electronic Commerce and Internet Society Research Center" at NSYSU is the only social science research center in Taiwan that has been selected for the European Commission's 7th Framework Programme (FP7) SSH-NCP.

NSYSU manages one of Taiwan's three Marine research vessels, the Ocean Researcher 3. In 2019, National Science and Technology Council (NSTC) built a new generation of research vessels for it.

As of 2024, NSYSU had 45 research centers, including the following most important key centers:

Higher Education Sprout Project Featured Research Center

- Intelligent Electronic Commerce Research Center
- Center of Crystal Research
- Center for Strategy and Human Capital Research
- Assessment Research Center
- 6G Communication and Sensing Research Center
- Center of Excellence for Metabolic Associated Fatty Liver (CEMAFLD)

Tier-1 Certified Research Center

- Sun Yat-sen Research Center for Social Science
- Multidisciplinary and Data Science Research Center (MDSRC)
- Management Studies Research Center
- Engineer Technology Research & Promotion Center
- Frontier Center for Ocean Science and Technology
- Center for the Humanities
- Academia Research Center of Underwater Vehicles(ARCUV)

=== Rankings ===
National Sun Yat-sen University has been ranked consistently among the top 7 or 8 universities nationally in QS World University Rankings, Times Higher Education World University Rankings, and Academic Ranking of World Universities.

University rankings (overall)
THE Asia	General	141 (2025)
QS Asia	General	99 (2024)
THE World	General	601-800 (2025)
QS World	General	439 (2025)
ARWU World	Research	601-700 (2023)
RUR World	General	333(2024)

- QS World University Rankings

According to QS World University Rankings (2025), NSYSU is the 8th-ranked university in Taiwan (439th worldwide).

- Times Higher Education

According to Times Higher Education (2024), NSYSU is the 8th-ranked public university in Taiwan (141st Asia; 610-800th worldwide).

- Academic Ranking of World Universities

According to Academic Ranking of World Universities (2021), NSYSU ranks #7 among Taiwan's national universities (601-700th worldwide).

Mathematics: 75-100th, 1st in Taiwan (2015).
Oceanography: 101-150th, 2nd in Taiwan (2020)
Engineering: 101-150th (2016)
Computer science: 151-200th (2015)
Telecommunication Engineering: 151-200th (2020)

- Round University Ranking

According to Round University Ranking (2024), NSYSU is the 5th-ranked university in Taiwan (333rd worldwide).

- THE 100 Under 50 university rankings

According to the Times Higher Education ranking of the 100 best universities under the age of 50 (2020), NSYSU ranks as the 6th university in Taiwan (201-250th worldwide).

- THES – QS World University Rankings

According to the THES - QS World University Rankings, NSYSU ranks among the world's 500 best universities, ranked at 401+ (2009).

- Global Views Monthly Taiwan University Rankings

In the 2023 list, NSYSU ranked 5th among comprehensive universities. In addition, it ranked:

2nd in social prestige
5th in industry-university cooperation
6th in internationalization
6th in teaching performance

- Financial Times – Executive MBA Ranking

According to Financial Times (2023), NSYSU's Global EMBA programme ranked 88th in the Executive MBA rankings, and IBMBA programme ranked 75th in the FT Masters in Management Ranking, and was the only ranked institution from Taiwan.

- Eduniversal World TOP 300 Business School

According to Eduniversal, among the ranked fields, NSYSU's maritime management ranks first in Asia.

Taiwan	Business School Level	2023 Recommendation Rate (per 1000)	School
1	UNIVERSAL	252 ‰	National Taiwan University – College of Management
2	TOP	164 ‰	National Chengchi University – College of Commerce
3	TOP	140 ‰	National Sun Yat-sen University – College of Management
4	EXCELLENT	104 ‰	Taiwan Tech – School of Management
5	EXCELLENT	60 ‰	Fu Jen Catholic University – College of Management
6	EXCELLENT	56 ‰	National Yang MIng Chiao Tung University – College of Management
7	GOOD	72 ‰	National Cheng Kung University – College of Management

- Other Rankings:
  - 19th worldwide (2nd in Taiwan) in Public Administration/Management.
  - 24th worldwide (1st in Asia) in Maritime Management.
  - 91st worldwide (1st in Taiwan) in Health Management
  - 6th in Far East Asia (1st in Taiwan) in Human Resources Management
  - 9th in Far East Asia (1st in Taiwan) in Corporate Communication
  - 15th in Far East Asia (1st in Taiwan) in Information Systems Management
  - 23rd in Far East Asia in Corporate Finance
  - 28th in Far East Asia in Executive MBA

=== University alliances ===
NSYSU is a member of University Academic Alliance in Taiwan (UAAT). The members include twelve universities such as National Taiwan University, National Taiwan Normal University, National Cheng Kung University, National Tsing Hua University, National Yang Ming Chiao Tung University, National Chengchi University, and National Taiwan University of Science and Technology.

NSYSU is part of the Taiwan Comprehensive University System, which includes National Chung Cheng University, National Chung Hsing University, and National Cheng Kung University.

NSYSU formed an alliance with Kaohsiung Medical University to allow students from both schools to take courses and choose majors beyond the typical limits of public and private universities.

NSYSU is a member of EUTW university alliance, Pacific Asian Consortium for International Business Education and Research (PACIBER), Asia-Pacific Association for International Education (APAIE), Taiwan-UK University Consortium, Taiwan University Alliance for Sustainable Governance, and Association of Asia-Pacific Business Schools (AAPBS).

=== Benchmark Partner institutions ===
- University of California, San Diego (UCSD), the United States
- University of Osaka, Japan
- University of Gent (UGENT), Belgium

=== International Cooperation ===
NSYSU has established 307 partners in 44 countries across Europe, Asia, Oceania, and the Americas. At the same time, it has signed dual /accelerated degree agreements with 30 overseas universities. Some of the sister relationships are listed below: the University of Pennsylvania, UCLA, UCSD, UC Riverside, Case Western, Temple, Texas A&M in the US. Australian National, Queensland University of Technology in Australia. University of Bristol, Essex in the UK. Linköping, KTH, Linnaeus in Sweden. LMU Munich, Hamburg, Cologne, Freiburg in Germany. McGill, Ottawa, Victoria in Canada. Sapienza University of Rome, Polytechnic University of Milan in Italy. Nanyang Technological, NUS, Singapore Management University in the Singapore. University of Tokyo, Hokkaido, Kyoto, Kyushu, Tohoku, Hiroshima, Waseda in Japan. Korea University, Seoul National, Yonsei, Sungkyunkwan in South Korea. Chulalongkorn, Mahidol in Thailand. Malaya in Malaysia. Peking, Tsinghua, Shanghai Jiao Tong, Fudan, Sun Yat-sen, Zhejiang in mailand China. Chinese University of Hong Kong, City University of Hong Kong in HK. University of Macau in Macao. Moscow State in Russia.

NSYSU has been chosen by the Ministry of Education as one of Taiwan's four landmark bilingual universities. NSYSU signed the Taiwan Huayu BEST Program partnership with West Virginia University, George Mason, University of Kansas, and Utah State.

NSYSU and Middlebury College have formed an alliance to establish "Middlebury School in Taiwan." The College of Management at National Sun Yat-sen University, in collaboration with the University of Victoria and JKU Linz, jointly organizes the ACT Global Program. Additionally, NSYSU has established the Cross-strait EMBA (CSEMBA) program in collaboration with Tongji. NSYSU is a member of Open Society University Network (OSUN).

The Ministry of Foreign Affairs, in collaboration with the U.S. think tank East-West Center, organizes the Pacific Islands Leadership Program (PILP). NSYSU is responsible for part of the training program during the Taiwan phase.

The Ministry of Education entrusted NSYSU with the responsibility of operating the Taiwan Education Center in the Philippines.

NSYSU has an active International Student Association. In 2009–2010 well over 250 international students were members of the ISA association at NSYSU, participating in over 20 student events. ISA has five key points: Student Services, Public Services, Social Events, Sports, and Scholarship. The 2010–2011 International Student Executive Board will tentatively be elected in the fall of 2010 at NSYSU. The Office of International Affairs at NSYSU traditionally has monitored the election process.

Taiwan's first P.R.C. and Burkina Faso student to receive a doctorate are both graduates of the NSYSU Institute of China and Asia-Pacific Studies.

== Distinctive Government Think Tanks ==
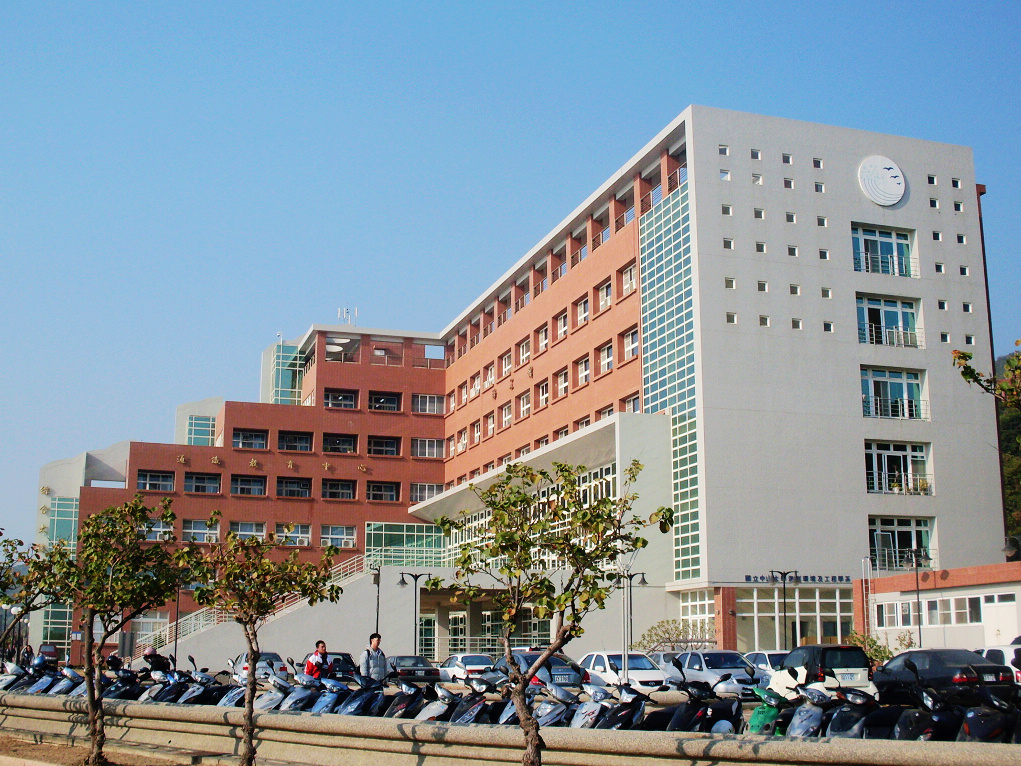
NSYSU Siwan College

National Sun Yat-sen University known for its political and commercial relations, its faculty and staff serve as bureaucrats and NGO experts to maintain close contact with industry and government officials.

In 2021, the American Institute in Taiwan (AIT) affirmed in an official statement that NSYSU, as one of Taiwan's top universities, is also an important promoter of US-Taiwan relations.

The US, EU, and Japanese offices
Founded under the auspices of the United States government, European Commission, and Japanese government: the Sun Yat-sen American Center (est.1999), European Union Centre at NSYSU (est.2009), and Center for Japanese Studies at NSYSU (est.2010) are Southern Taiwan's only official office for political and academic exchanges.

Lee Teng-hui Center for Governmental Studies
Named in honor of former Taiwanese president Lee Teng-hui, the "Lee Teng-hui Center for Governmental Studies" established on February 1, 2017 (succeeding the "Dr. Teng-Hui Lee Political Economy Seminar," founded in 2002). The center serves as a regional think tank, with the purpose of providing prescient and integrated research or advice for governmental policies and social issues.

Center for Market Research and Public Opinion Polling
The Center for Market Research and Public Opinion Polling at NSYSU is the most important social science research center and public opinion survey unit in Southern Taiwan. The Center and National Chengchi University's Election Study Center are listed as Taiwan's two major university polling institutions.

== Notable alumni ==
More see List in Chinese version

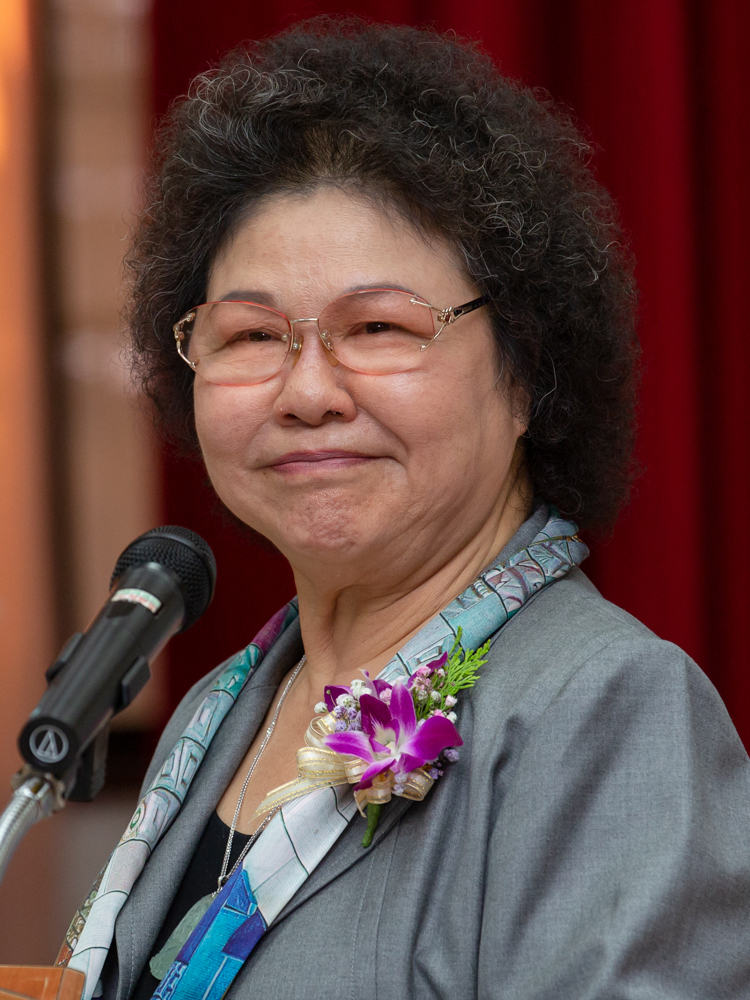
Chen Chu, Mayor of Kaohsiung for three terms

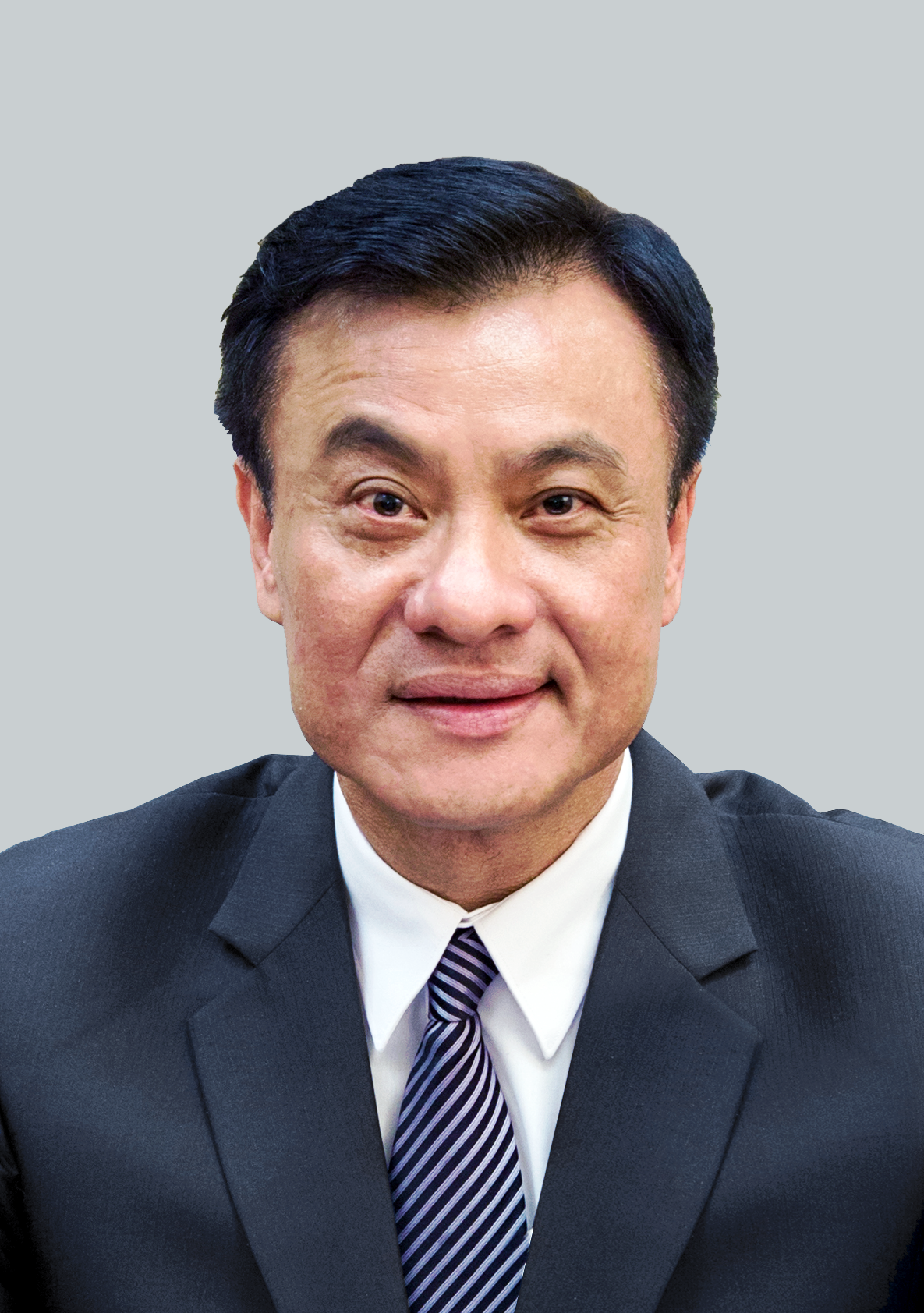
Su Jia-chyuan, 9th President of the Legislative Yuan

NSYSU graduates include the President of the Legislative Yuan Su Jia-chyuan, the Mayor of Kaohsiung Chen Chu, Member of the Pennsylvania House of Representatives David H. Rowe, and Fortune 500 Executives, such as John Lin, the Vice President of eBay, Yuei-An Liou, a space scientist and professor, and chairman of the Financial Supervisory Commission Huang Tien-mu.

Legislators
Member of Legislative Yuan

- Chao Tien-lin
- Cheng Tsao-min
- Chen Li-hui
- Chiang Lin-chun
- Chiu Chih-wei
- Chung Shao-ho
- Hou Tsai-feng
- Hsu Chih-ming
- Hsu Jung-shu
- Huang Chao-shun
- Kuo Ching-sheng
- Lai Chen-chang
- Lee Kun-tse
- Liu Chun-hsiung
- Lin Chih-lung
- Lin Yi-shih
- Lwo Shih-hsiung
- Pan Men-an
- Wang Chin-lien
- Wang Chin-shih
- Yu Chen Yueh-ying

And others: Ng Hong-mun (Guangdong period), Lin Ruo (Guangdong period)

Others

- Hwang Yau-tai (Guangdong period)
- Yang Huimin (Guangdong period)
- Yang Cho-cheng
- Lo Chih-chiang

== Honorary doctorate ==
As of June 2021, a total of 24 people had received honorary doctoral degrees. For the full list, please refer to the announcement of the Academic Affairs Office of National Sun Yat-sen University.

Name	Year	Reason
Lien Chan	1995	Politician, the Vice-President of the Republic of China (Taiwan).
14th Dalai Lama	1996	Politician, Nobel Peace Prize winner.
Yuan T. Lee	1996	Chemist, Nobel Prize in Chemistry winner, president of Academic Sinica.
Kao Ching-yuen	1997	CEO of Uni-President Enterprises Corporation.
Robert C. Merton	1998	Economist, Nobel Memorial Prize in Economic Sciences winner.
Lee Huan	1999	Politician, the Premier of the Republic of China (Taiwan).
Gao Xingjian	2000	Writer, Nobel Prize in Literature winner.
Peter Raven	2001	Scientist, member of National Academy of Sciences.
Vernon L. Smith	2003	Economist, Nobel Memorial Prize in Economic Sciences winner.
Alex Horng	2004	CEO of Sunonwealth Electric Machine Industry Co., Ltd.
Gennady P. Turmov	2004	President of Far Eastern State Technical University, Russia
Chi-Huey Wong	2007	Chemist, Wolf Prize in Chemistry winner president of Academic Sinica.

== 2019 Information Security Incident ==
NSYSU experienced a serious information security incident in November 2019. It is suspected that overseas hackers from China used XSS to monitor the email boxes of nearly 100 faculty members of NSYSU's College of Social Sciences and the College of Marine Sciences.

Because the primary victims (politics, Cross-Strait relations, and public policy scholars) are associated with government think tanks, the invasion may have introduced a threat to national security.

== Affiliated school ==
- Guoguang Laboratory School, National Sun Yat-sen University (國立中山大學附屬國光高級中學)

== See also ==
- List of universities in Taiwan
  - List of schools in the Republic of China reopened in Taiwan
- Taiwan Comprehensive University System
- Sun Yat-sen University (disambiguation)
  - Sun Yat-sen University in Guangzhou, China
  - Moscow Sun Yat-sen University in Moscow, Soviet Union
