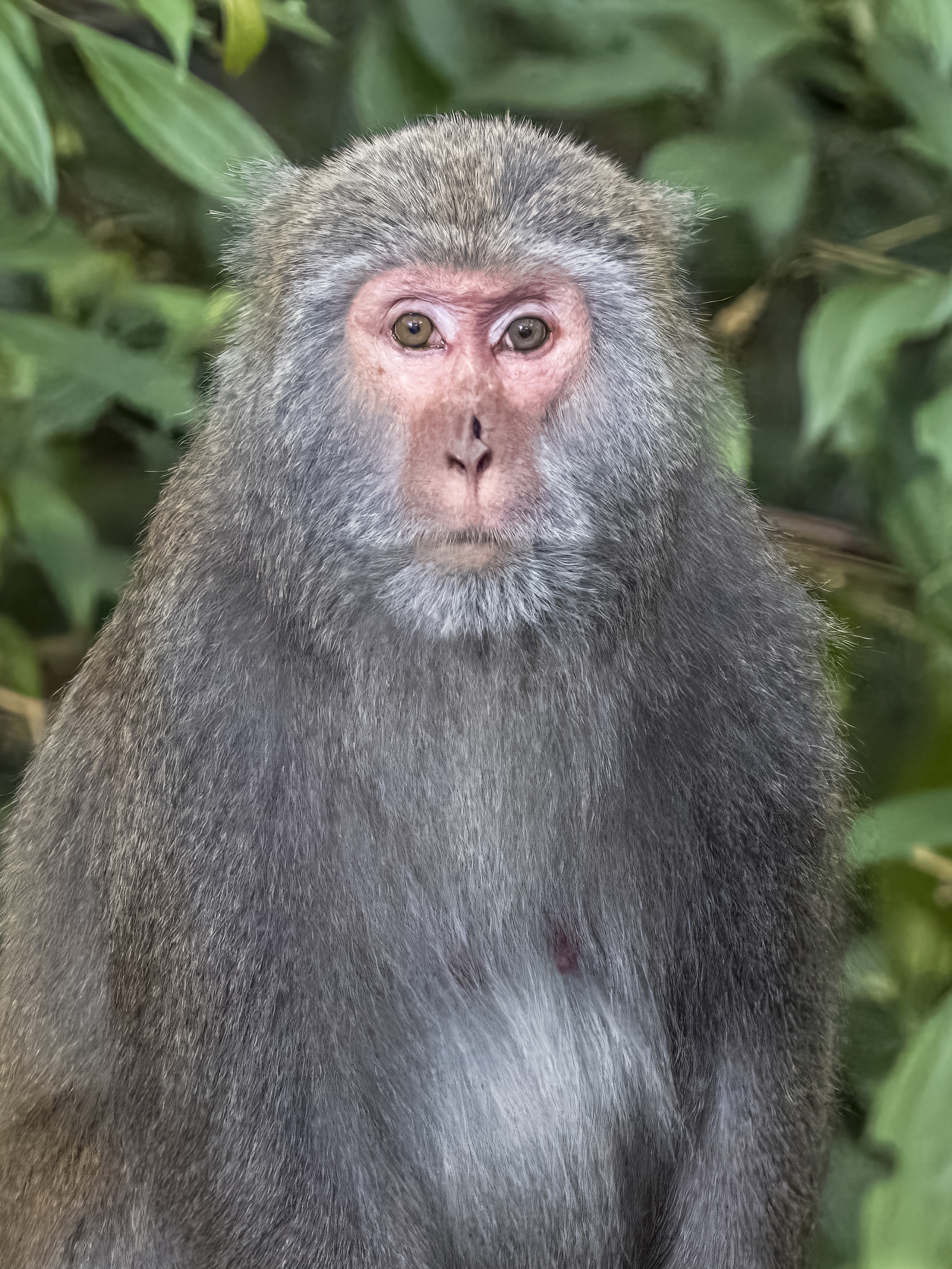
- Female

Conservation status
- Least Concern (IUCN 3.1)

Scientific classification
- Kingdom: Animalia
- Phylum: Chordata
- Class: Mammalia
- Order: Primates
- Family: Cercopithecidae
- Genus: Macaca
- Species: M. cyclopis

Binomial name
- Macaca cyclopis (Swinhoe, 1862)
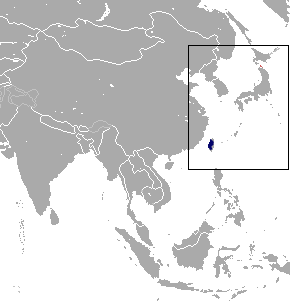
- Formosan rock macaque range (blue — native, red — introduced)

= Formosan rock macaque =

Species of Old World monkey

The Formosan rock macaque (Macaca cyclopis), also known as the Formosan rock monkey or Taiwanese macaque, is a macaque endemic to the island of Taiwan, which has also been introduced to Japan. Besides humans, Formosan rock macaques are the only native primates living in Taiwan. The species was first described by Robert Swinhoe in 1862.

== Physical characteristics ==
Rock macaques measure 50–60 cm and weigh 5–12 kg, generally females are smaller. Their tails are moderately long and measure 26–45 cm. The Formosan rock macaque is brown or gray in color. Like all other macaques, it has specialized pouch-like cheeks, allowing it to temporarily hoard its food. The gathered morsels are eaten sometime later, in safe surroundings.

== Life and behavior ==
Among the 22 species of the genus Macaca that are found in southern and eastern Asia as well as northwestern Africa, the Formosan macaque is the only species endemic to the island of Taiwan.

Formosan rock macaques live in mixed coniferous-hardwood temperate forest, as well as bamboo and grassland at 100–3600m (328–11,812 ft). The social structure of macaques is generally characterized as often occurring as a large stable multimale-multifemale troop. Formosan macaque is considered to be female-bonded which is similar to other species in the genus Macaca. Based on the study of Hsu and Lin, the average overall sex ratio was approximately 1:1, and the average adult sex ratio was close to 0.53. Solitary adult males accounted for 5% of the entire population, and they were seen interacting with social troops especially during mating season. They communicate using visual signals and sounds. They will "scream" when non-group members come near them. Group members usually respond using a "kyaw-kyaw" sound.

Rock macaques are diurnal, arboreal, and terrestrial. They usually stay in trees and less so on the ground. They rest in forest and forage in grasslands. Their diet consists of fruits, tender leaves, buds, grass stems, insects, snails, and bird eggs.

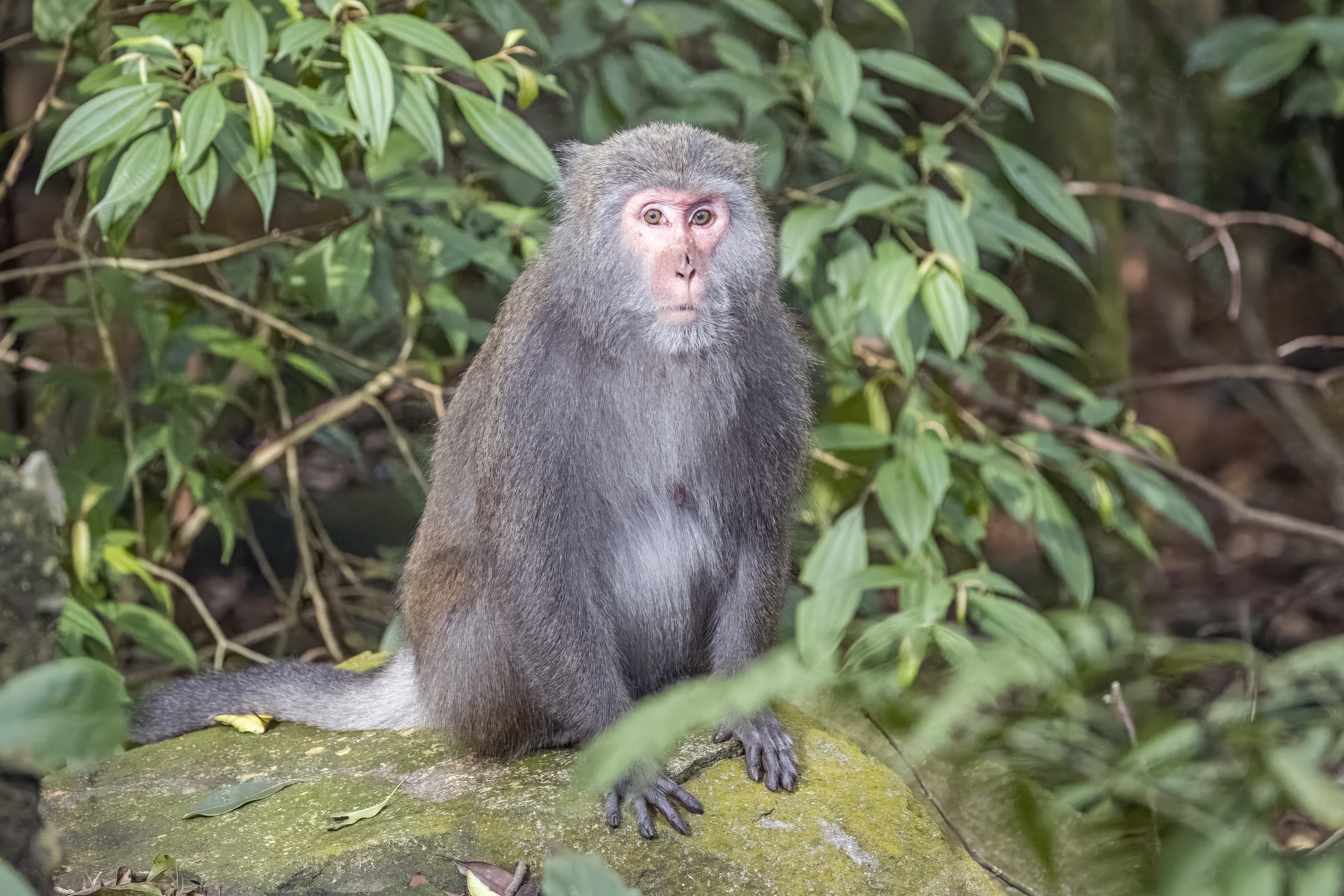
female, Yangmingshan National Park

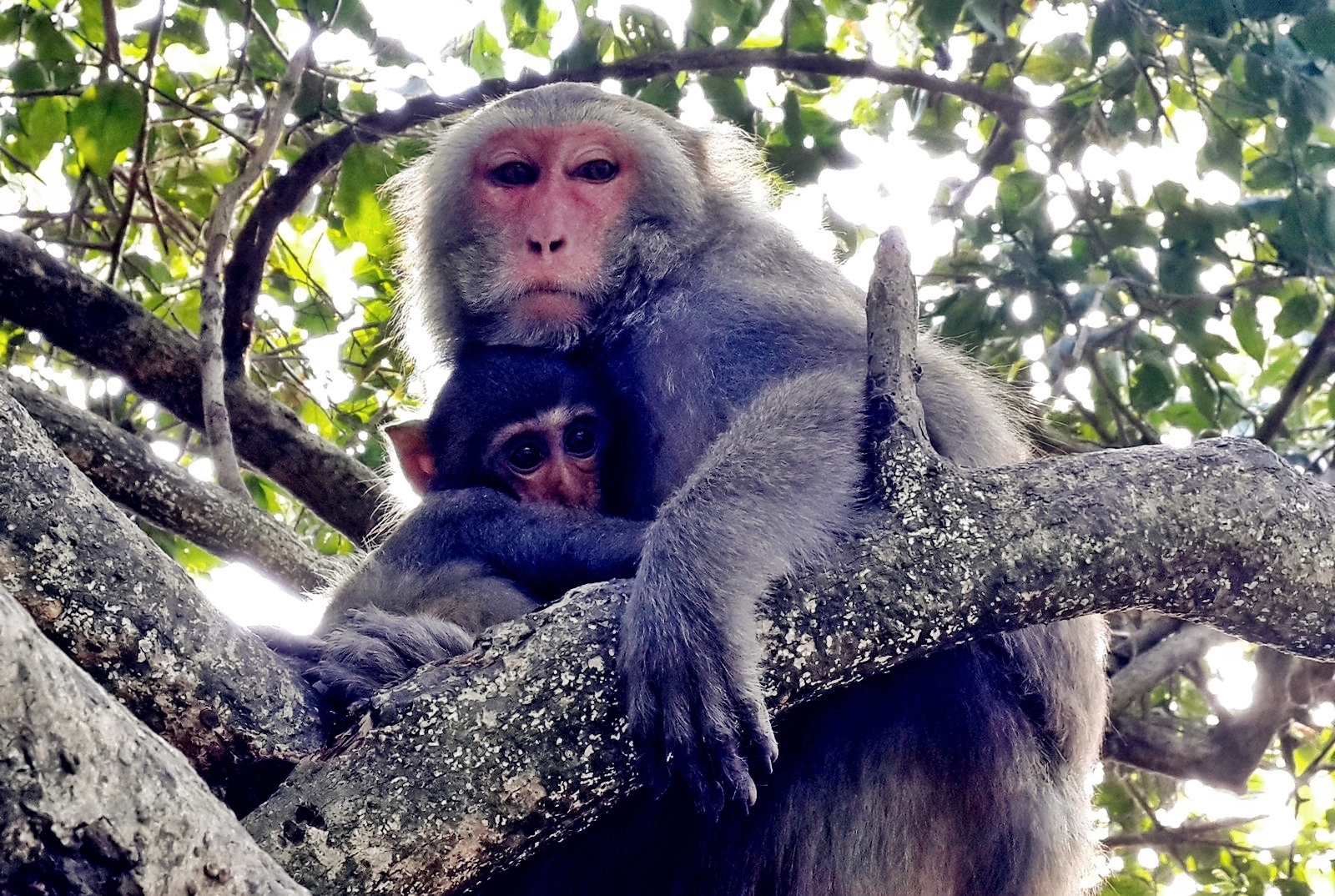
with juvenile in Shoushan National Nature Park

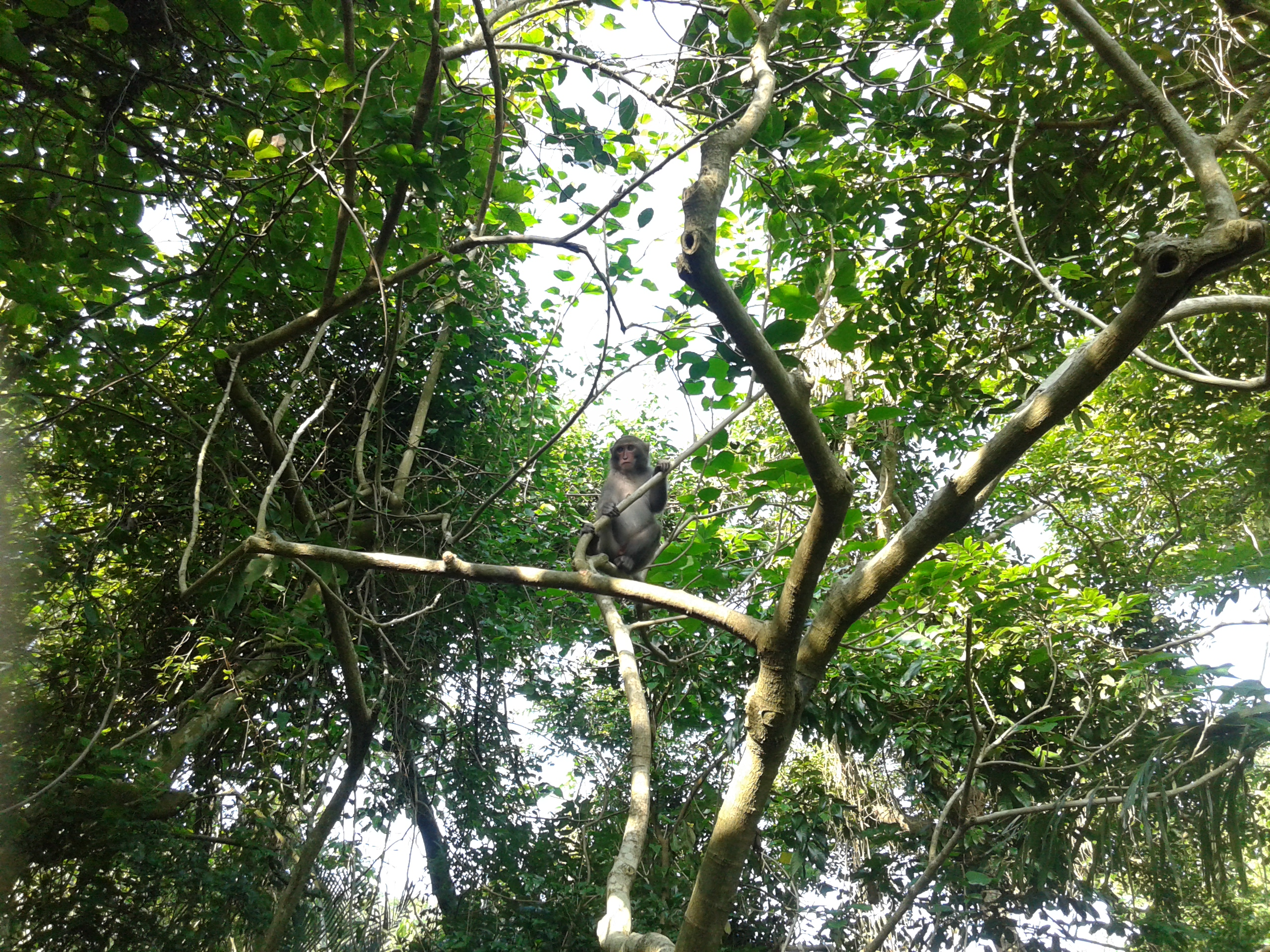
in Shoushan National Nature Park

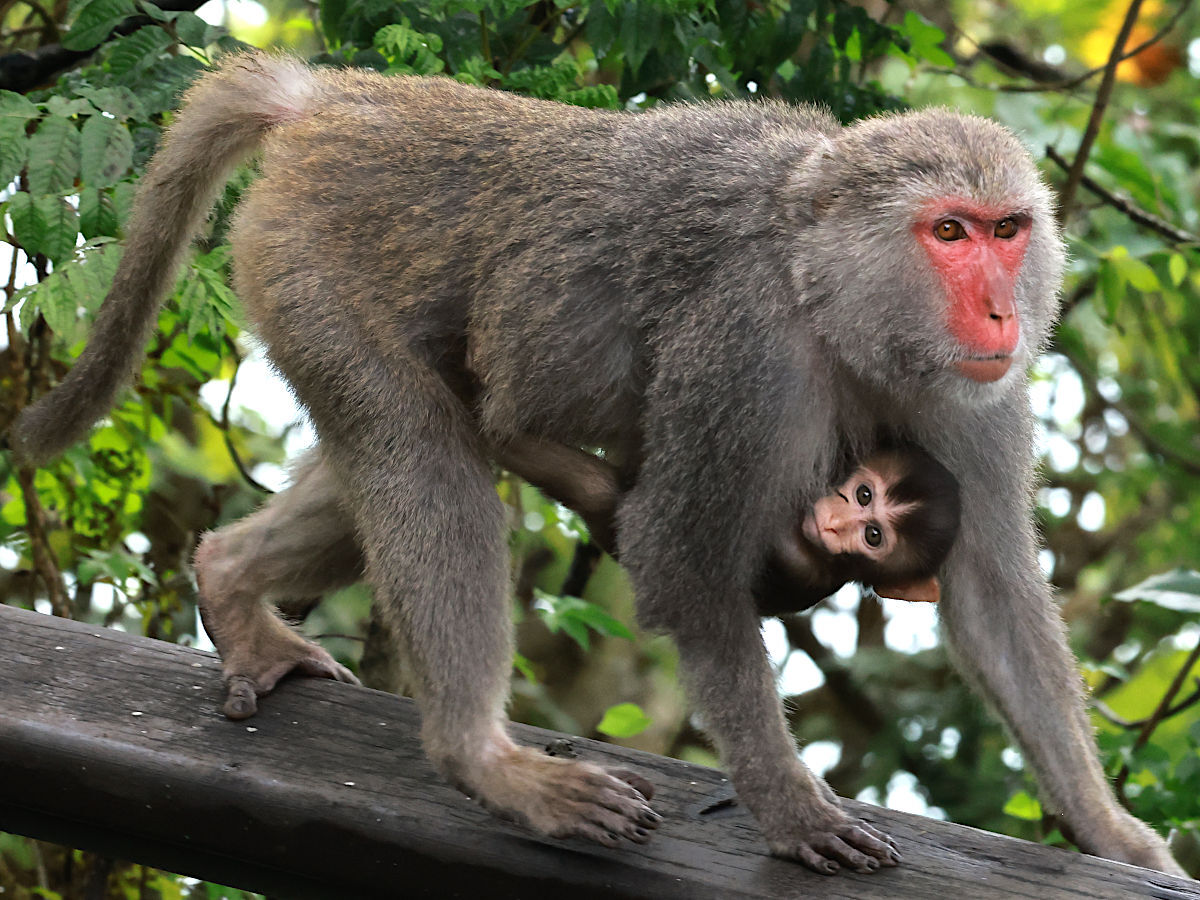
in Sun Moon Lake

== Reproduction ==
The Formosan rock macaque gives birth to a single offspring. During estrus, the perineum of the female swells at the base of the tail, and there is also swelling along the thighs. Their mating season is from October to January. Gestation may last about five and a half months. Females give birth to babies between spring and summer. Females are entirely responsible for nursing. Youngsters are carried in mother's arms for 2–3 months. Not until one year old, will youngsters be fully separated from their parents carrying.

== Conservation ==
Formosan rock macaques are hunted for the damage they do to crops. They are also hunted for the purpose of exports for medical experimental use. In Taiwan, there is a strong culture of feeding macaques (in parks, along roadsides), particularly on the west coast, which increases their interaction and incidents with humans. Recent efforts by the government have tried to stop this behaviour, with mixed results.

== See also ==
- List of protected species in Taiwan
- List of endemic species of Taiwan
