= Jiaotong University =

Jiaotong University, Jiao Tong University, or Chiao Tung University (simplified Chinese: 交通大学; traditional Chinese: 交通大學) was established in 1921 by the Ministry of Transportation of the Republic of China's Beiyang government under the merger of the three scattered universities, and later separated into five universities to date. These five universities include:

- Beijing Jiaotong University in Haidian, Beijing, Mainland China
- National Yang Ming Chiao Tung University in Hsinchu and Taipei, Taiwan
- Shanghai Jiao Tong University in Shanghai, Mainland China
- Southwest Jiaotong University in Chengdu, Sichuan, Mainland China
- Xi'an Jiaotong University in Xi'an, Shaanxi, Mainland China

== Others ==
There are other universities in China are also named by Jiaotong University, however these universities have no connection with the original Jiaotong University, Jiao Tong University, or Chiao Tung University (simplified Chinese: 交通大学; traditional Chinese: 交通大學) which was established in 1921. These universities include:

- Chongqing Jiaotong University in Chongqing, Mainland China
- Dalian Jiaotong University in Dalian, Liaoning, Mainland China
- East China Jiaotong University in Nanchang, Jiangxi, Mainland China
- Lanzhou Jiaotong University in Lanzhou, Gansu, Mainland China

== See also ==
- Sun Yat-sen University (disambiguation)
- Transport University (disambiguation)
