= Hsu Chih-ming =

Taiwanese politician (born 1957)

Hsu Chih-ming MLY
- 徐志明
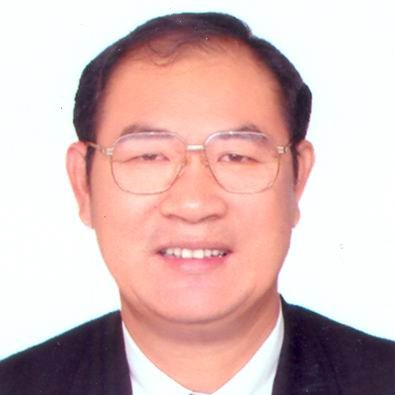

Member of the Legislative Yuan
- In office 1 February 1999 – 7 October 2005
- Constituency: Kaohsiung County

Personal details
- Born: 26 March 1957 (age 69)
- Party: Democratic Progressive Party
- Education: Knightsbridge University (BA); National Sun Yat-sen University (MPA)
- Occupation: politician

Hsu Chih-ming (Chinese: 徐志明; pinyin: Xú Zhìmíng; born 26 March 1957) is a Taiwanese politician.

== Career ==
Hsu attended primary school in Daliao, Kaohsiung. He was active in local politics, serving on the district council as well as mayor of Daliao. Hsu also represented his home district on the Kaohsiung County Council. Hsu received a degree from the distance learning institution Knightsbridge University and completed graduate work in political science at National Sun Yat-sen University (NSYSU).

Hsu was first elected to the Legislative Yuan in 1998. During his 2001 reelection campaign, Hsu was indicted for electoral fraud on 22 November, becoming the first-ever legislative candidate in Taiwanese history to be charged with electoral fraud before the election had passed. By 2 December, just a day after polls closed, Hsu was one of four candidates to be charged with buying votes. In June 2002, Taiwan Solidarity Union lawmaker Su Ying-kwei accused Democratic Progressive Party legislators Hsu, Cheng Tsao-min, and Liang Mu-yang of interference in construction bids at the Lungmen Nuclear Power Plant. A legislative committee was specially convened to investigate the charges. In May 2003, the Taiwan High Court found Hsu guilty of accepting NT$3.95 million in kickbacks in a separate case dating back to 1994, when he was mayor of Daliao. The Supreme Court refused to rule on Hsu's appeal of the 1994 case in 2005. As a result, Hsu was expelled from the legislature, and his Democratic Progressive Party membership suspended.

Hsu's son Hsu Ching-huang left the Democratic Progressive Party to represent the Kuomintang in legislative by-elections held in 2011.
