= Shoushan (Kaohsiung) =

Mountain in Gushan, Kaohsiung, Taiwan

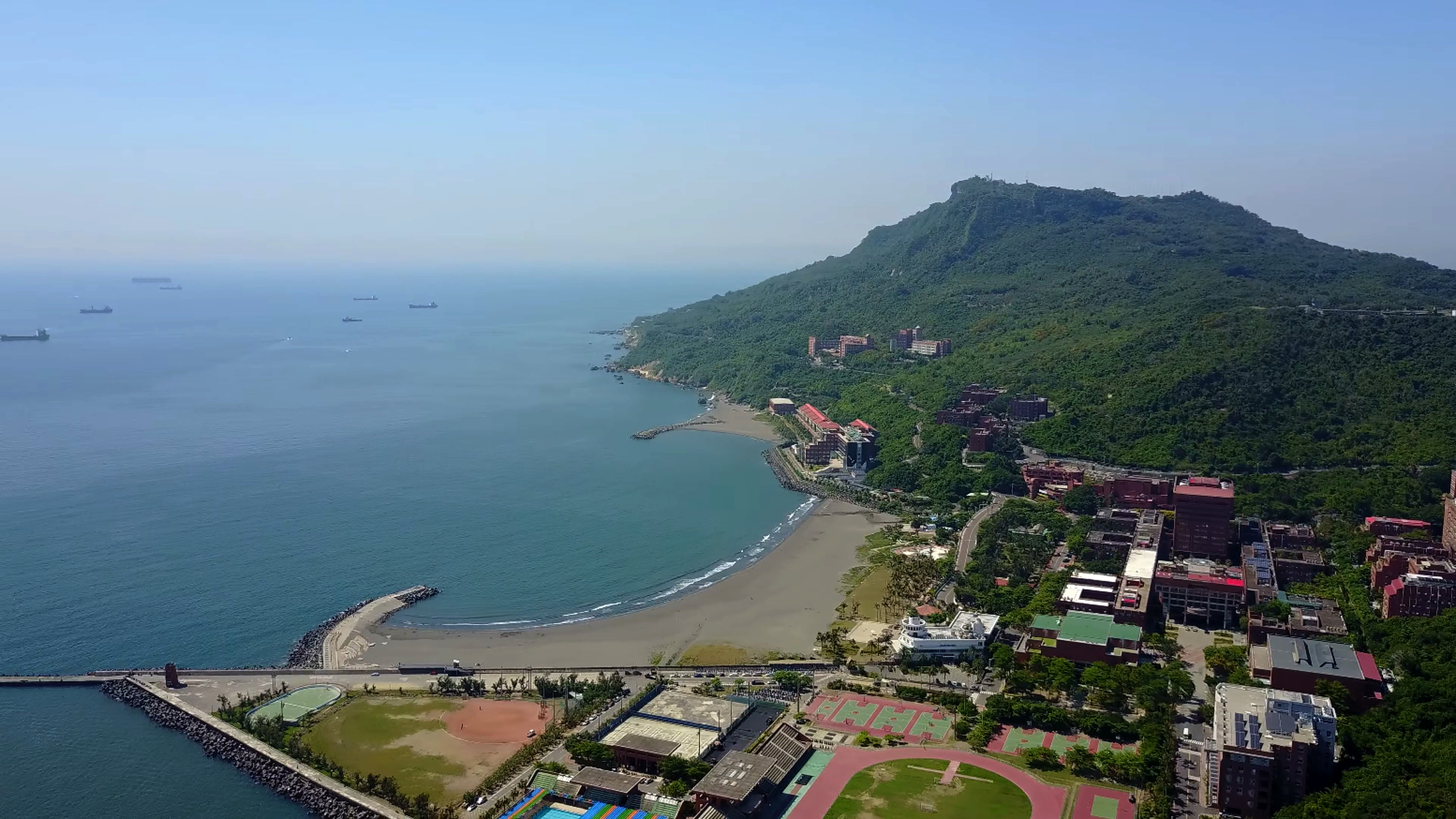
- Shoushan with National Sun Yat-sen University in the foreground

Highest point
- Elevation: 356 meters
- Coordinates: 22°38′19″N 120°15′54″E

Geography
- Location: Kaohsiung, Taiwan
- Parent range: None

Geology
- Rock age: More than 1000 ka

Climbing
- Easiest route: hiking

Shoushan (Chinese: 壽山, also commonly known in English as Monkey Mountain or Apes' Hill, in Japanese as Kotobuki-yama) is a mountain in Gushan District, Kaohsiung, Taiwan, north of the main entrance to Kaohsiung Harbor. It was named Ape Hill by the Dutch in the 17th century to describe many Formosan rock macaques on this mountain. It is also called Chaishan (柴山) and includes the Snake Hill (蛇山 - a 17th-century term) in its northern part, and Long Life Hill (壽山) – named by Japanese in 1911-1915 for the crown-prince Hirohito – in the southern part. In some old maps, the peak of the hill is called Saracen's Head. Now it is a nature park where biological diversity can be seen.

== History ==
Shousan is one of the oldest ruins of civilization founded in Kaohsiung, dating back 4000 to 5000 years ago. Military installations were constructed through both Qing rule throughout the 17 and 18th century and Japanese rule from 1895 to 1945. It is now part of the Shoushan National Nature Park, and serves as a tourism attraction.

=== Historical landmarks ===
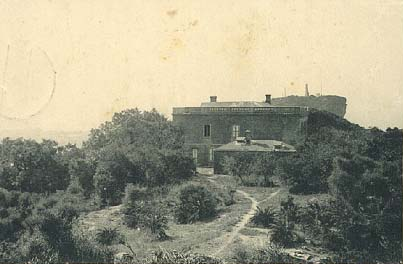
Former British Consulate at Takao

- The former British Consulate at Takao was established in 1865 as a trade centre between the Chinese and the British. It now serves as a historical landmark.
- Sizihwan – Located at the southern base of the mountain and facing the Pacific Ocean, Sizihwan is a natural harbor that serves as a main tourist attraction in Kaohsiung due to its oceanic scenery.
- National Sun Yat-sen University – First established in 1924 by Sun Yat-sen in Guangzhou as an educational institution based on his democratic ideals, the university was re-established in Sizihwan in 1980.

== Ecology ==
=== Plant life ===
Despite its status as a secondary forest, there are over 800 species of plants residing within Shoushan, with its tropical climate providing a suitable place for growth and species diversity. Notable species include:

- Dendrocnide meyeniana ("dog bitten fruit" in Chinese) - notable for the rashes it can cause on human skin.
- Paper mulberry
- Banyan

=== Animal species ===
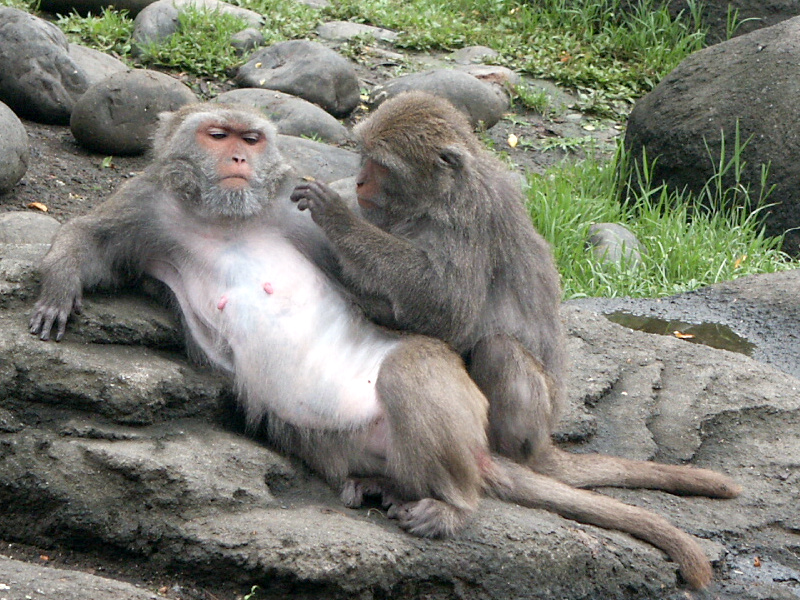
Formosan rock macaque

Shoushan hosts a total of 5 amphibian species, 24 reptiles, 106 birds and 8 mammals. Notable species include:

- Formosan rock macaque, a rare animal found only in Taiwan.
- Masked palm civet
- Black-throated laughingthrush
- Troides aeacus, a swallowtail butterfly found only in Taiwan and China

== Geography ==
View of Shoushan and the Taiwan Strait from Kaohsiung Lighthouse.

Shoushan is located in southern Taiwan within the vicinity of Kaohsiung stretching across the Gushan district. 5.5 Kilometres long from North to South and 2.5 kilometers wide from East to West with and overall landmass of around 485 hectares. In terms of height, Shoushan reaches a maximum elevation at around 365 meters from above sea level. Stretching from the Zuoying northern district to the southern peak of Sizihwan, Shoushan is the largest and most prominent landmark in Kaohsiung.

=== Climate ===
The climate of Shoushan belongs in the tropical standard, with an average annual temperature of 25.1 Celsius degrees and the lowest at 19.1 degrees in January and the highest at 29.1 in August. The annual rainfall totals up to 1748.6 millimetres, with the major wet season taking place between June and August.

== Geology ==
The mountain is made up of coral reefs and limestone, with evidence of the landscape rising above sea level. The limestone generally consists of coral, sea algae and shells. Due to its rise from sea level, the landscape of the mountain is severely effected by erosion from the sea, resulting in jagged cliffs and caves with stalactites.

=== Caves ===
The mountain and foothills contain a large number of caves, many of which are accessible. Four caves are open to the public during the dry season (November 1 to April 30) however a permit from the Shoushan National Nature Park management office is required for access.

== Notability ==
Shoushan is one of the mountains where Kaohsiung residents can see natural biological specimens within an hour's drive. There is an extensive system of boardwalk hiking trails that circle the mountain. Hikers can enjoy tea at various tea stations sprinkled throughout the trails. Water is carried to the tea stations by hikers who bring it from a reverse osmosis station at the bottom. From the tea station at the top of the mountain, hikers can see views of the Taiwan Strait through the trees.

The mountain is a reserve for Formosan rock macaques. Thousands of these monkeys reside on the mountain pestering hikers who have food with them.

== Access ==
There is an entrance to the mountain just east of the Shou Shan Zoo, as well as one beside the College of Liberal Arts building in National Sun Yat-sen University.

There are three other access points to the mountain along Gushan Road. The southernmost is beside Yuan Heng Temple; a second is located behind the Kaohsiung Municipal Ku Shan Senior High School; and the northernmost is located beside the Long Quan Temple, near the intersection with Xinjiang Road.

== See also ==
- List of tourist attractions in Taiwan
- Cihou Fort
