= North Gate of Xiong Town =

Gate in Gushan, Kaohsiung, Taiwan

- 雄鎮北門
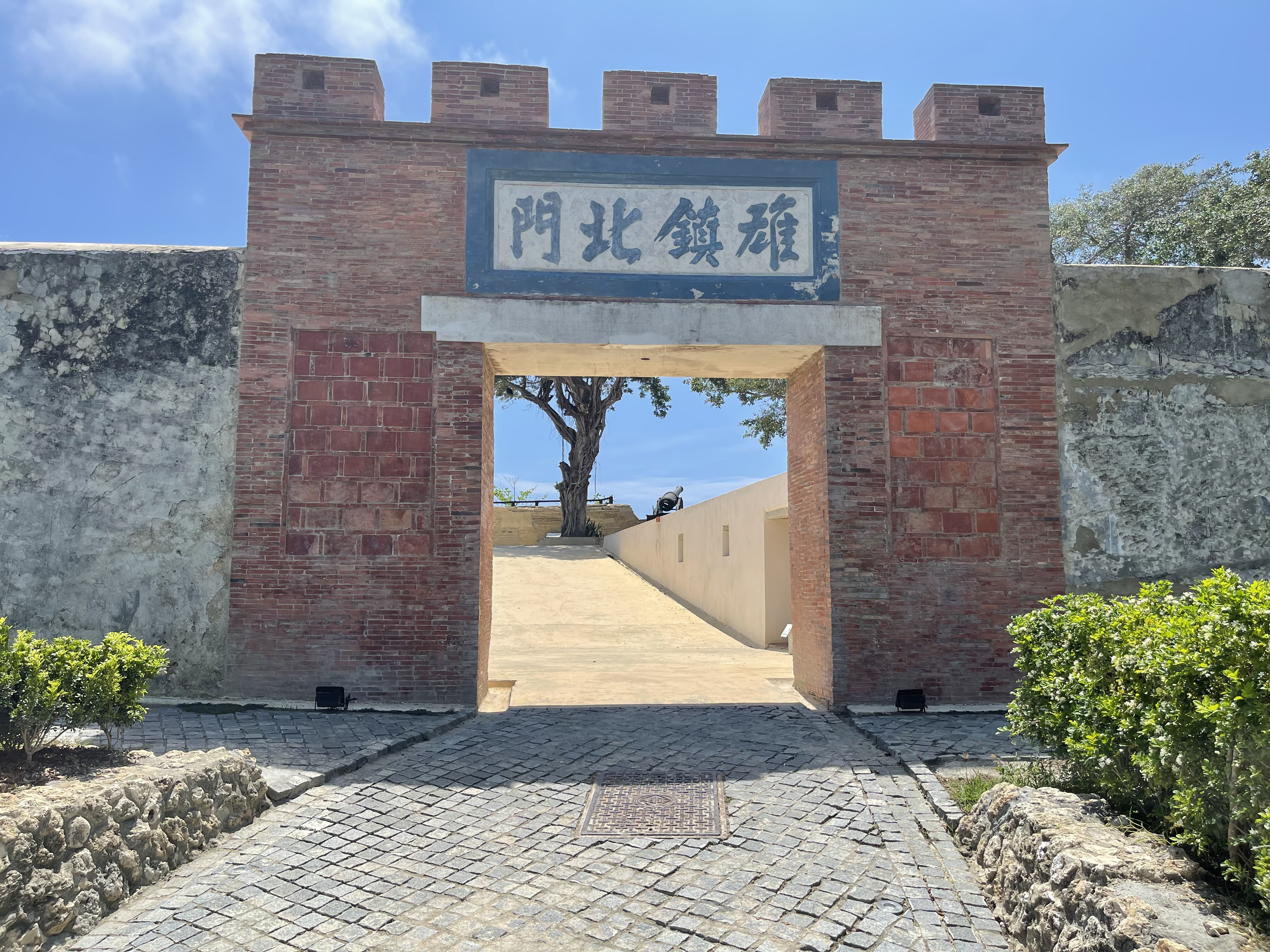
- Interactive map of the North Gate of Xiong Town area

General information
- Type: gate
- Location: Gushan, Kaohsiung, Taiwan
- Coordinates: 22°37′03.3″N 120°15′59.3″E
- Completed: 1875

The North Gate of Xiong Town (simplified Chinese: 雄镇北门; traditional Chinese: 雄鎮北門; pinyin: Xióngzhèn Běimén), also known as Syongjhen North Gate, is a historic gate in Gushan District, Kaohsiung, Taiwan.

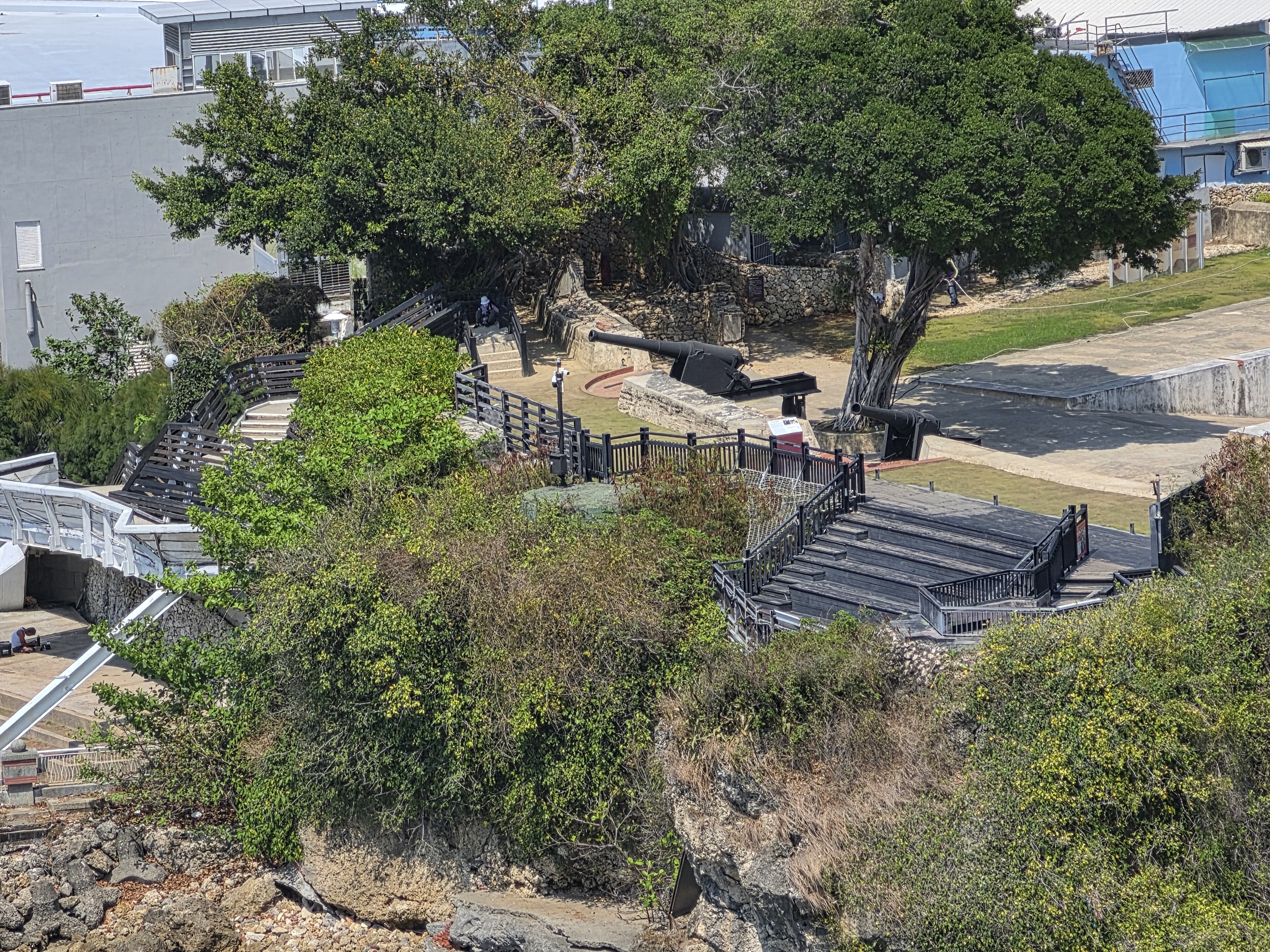
Gun battery of the North Gate of Xiong Town (雄鎮北門), seen from Kaohsiung Lighthouse

== History ==
The site was constructed in 1875 by the military of the Qing dynasty as part of a coastal defense system protecting Takao Harbor. It was built during the same period as Qihou Fort.

In 1895, following the First Sino-Japanese War, the fort was engaged by Japanese naval forces and subsequently captured. During the period of Japanese rule, the original cannons were removed, leaving only the arc-shaped gun mounts.

After 1945, control of Taiwan was transferred to the Republic of China, and the site was used as military barracks and a signal station. In 1985, military use ceased, and the site was designated as a Grade III heritage site by the Kaohsiung City Government. In 1992, it was opened to the public as a historical attraction. In 2022, restoration work was carried out by the Kaohsiung cultural authorities, and the site was reopened.

== Transportation ==
The gate is accessible within walking distance west of Hamasen station on the Kaohsiung MRT.

== Gallery ==
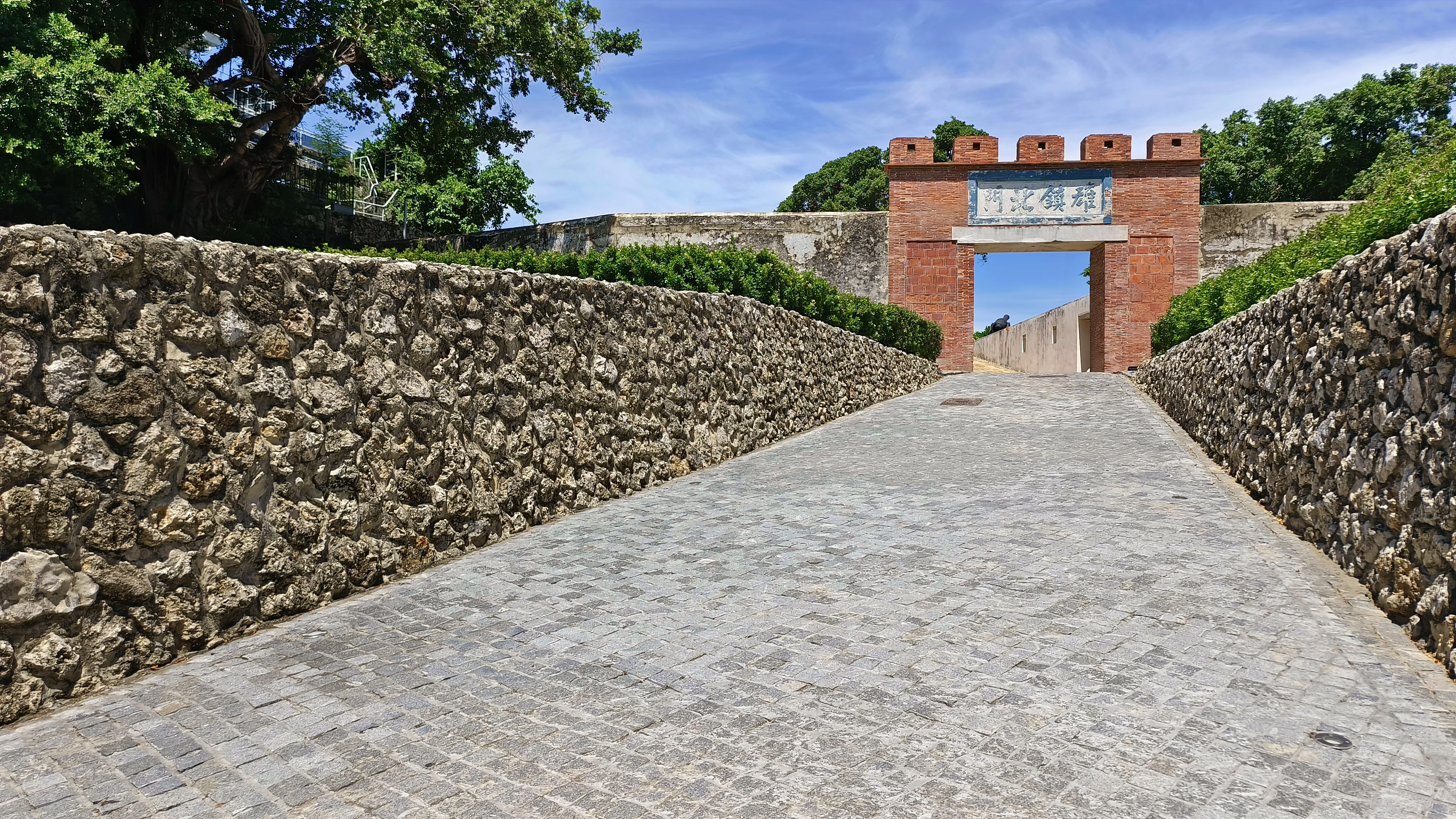

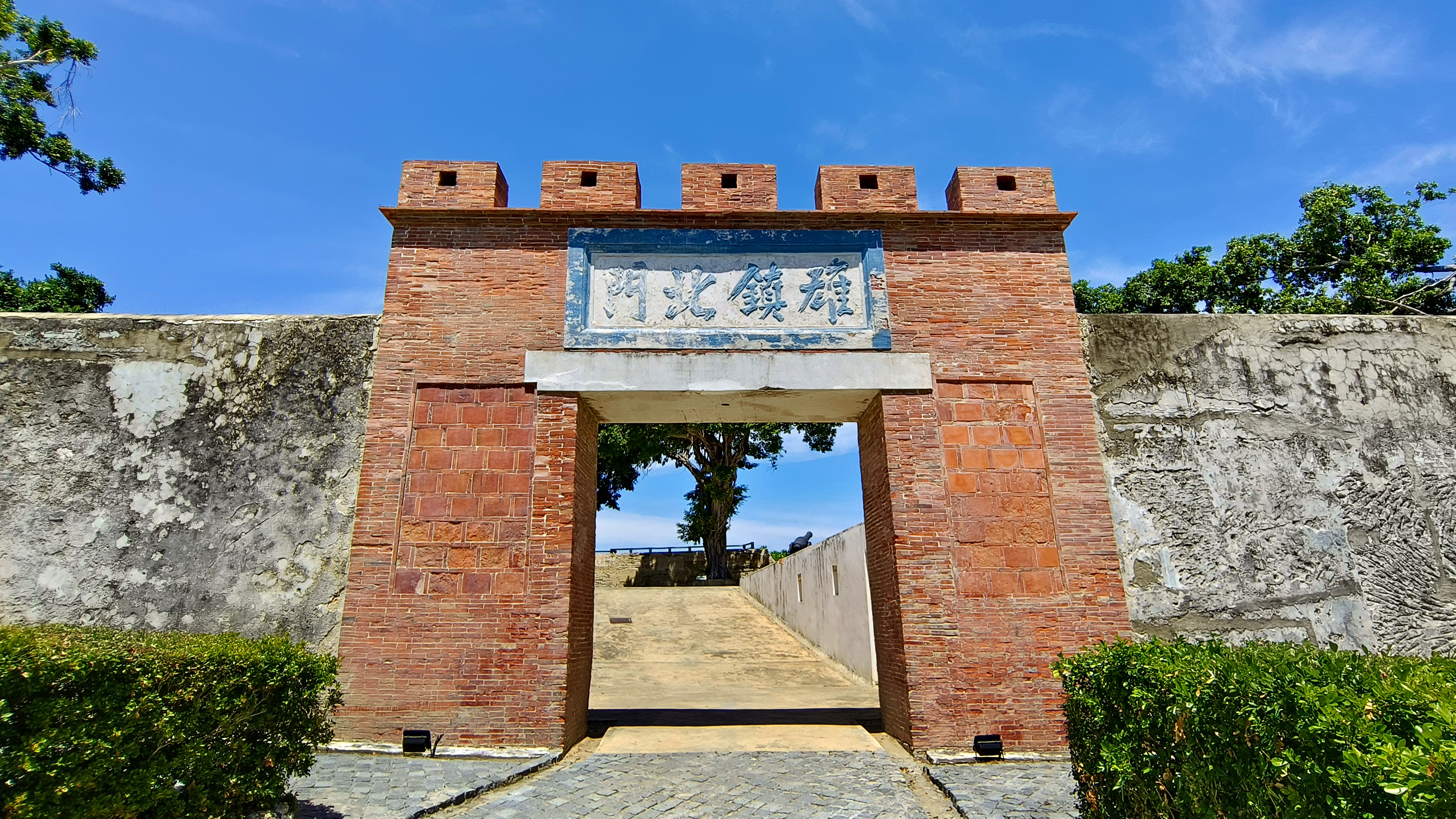

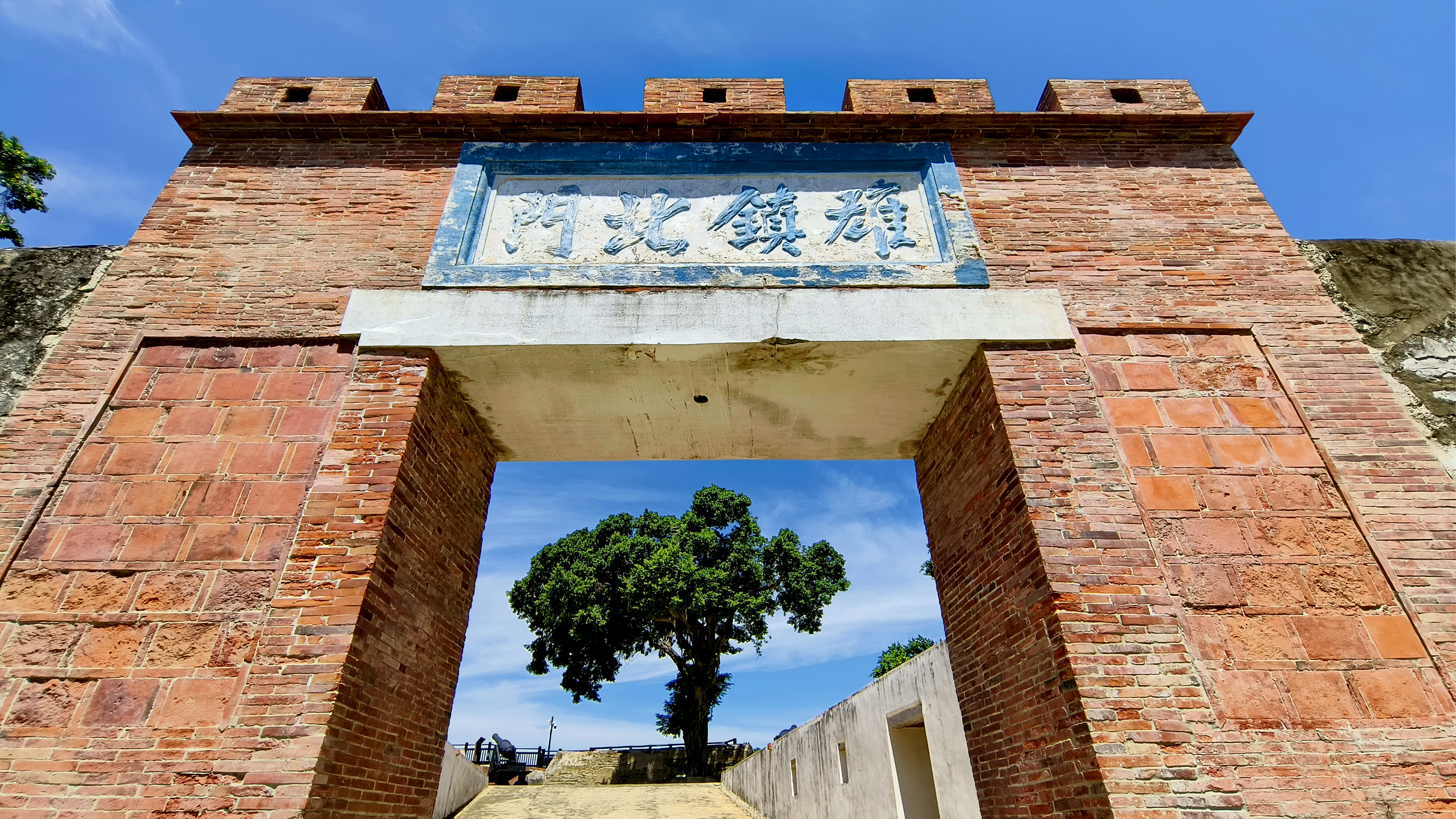

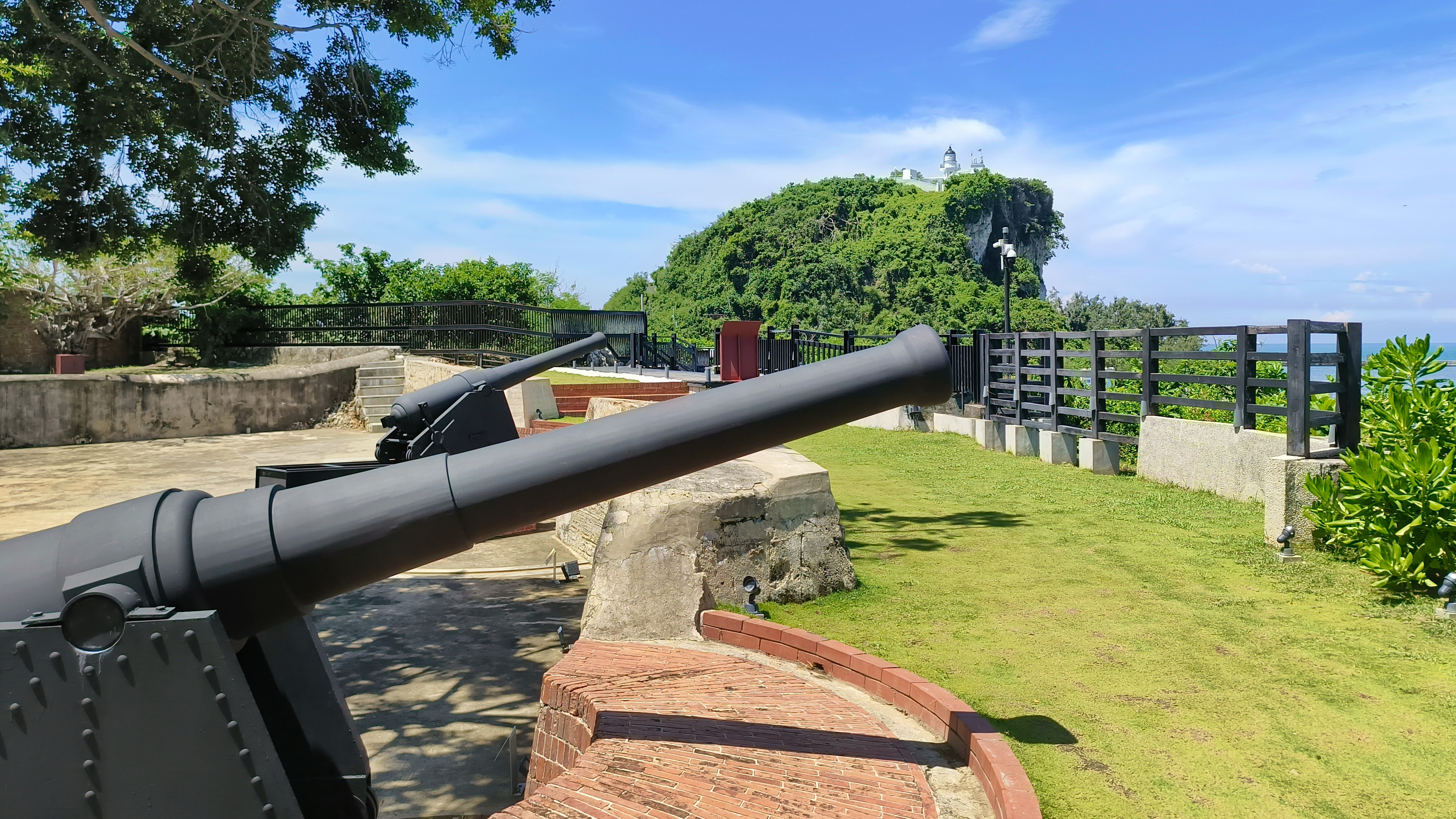
Gun battery

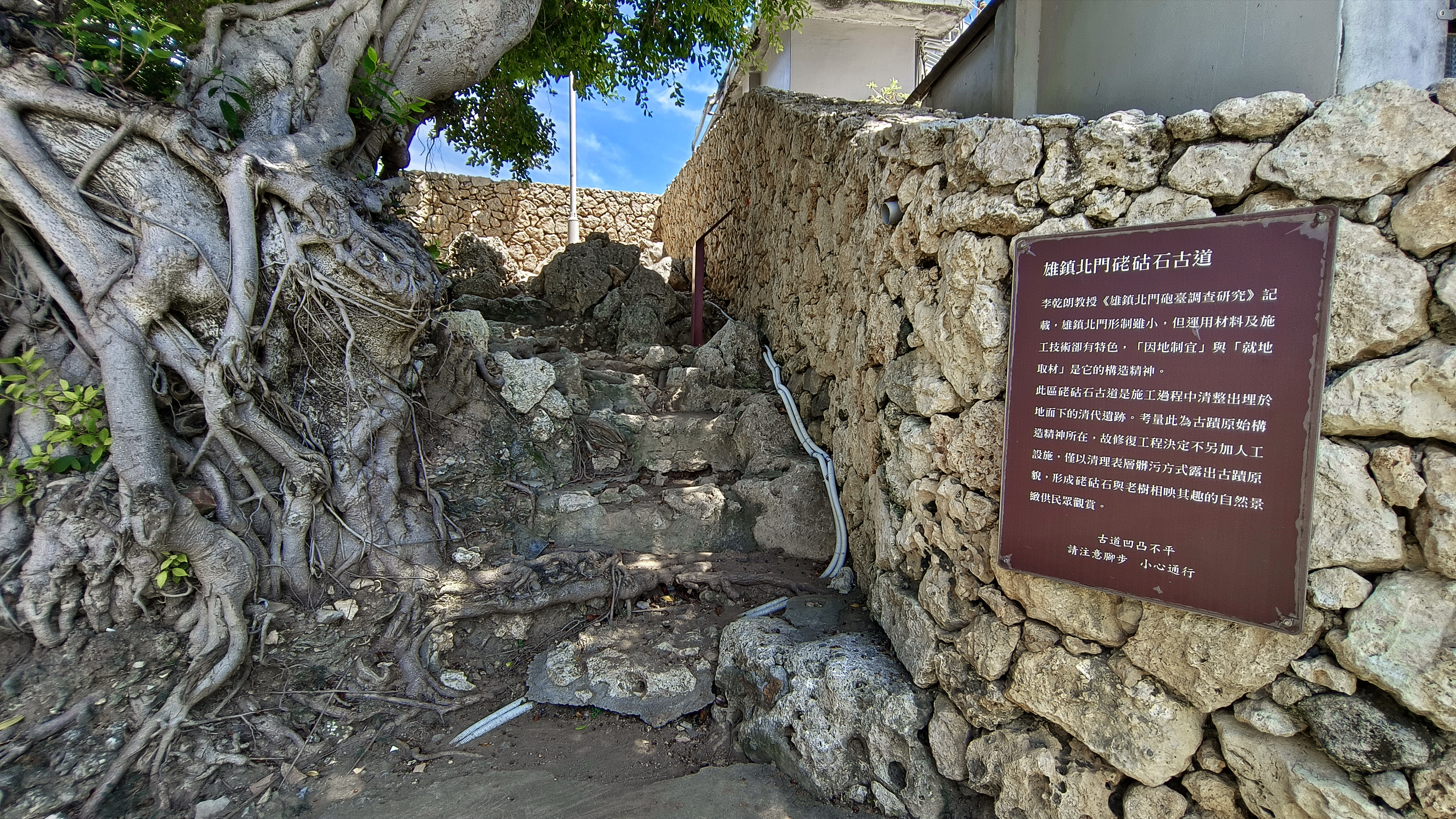
Coral stone historic trail

== See also ==
- List of tourist attractions in Taiwan
- Qihou Fort
- History of Kaohsiung
