= Cihou Fort =

Historic fort in Cijin, Kaohsiung, Taiwan

- 旗後砲臺
- Cijin, Kaohsiung, Taiwan
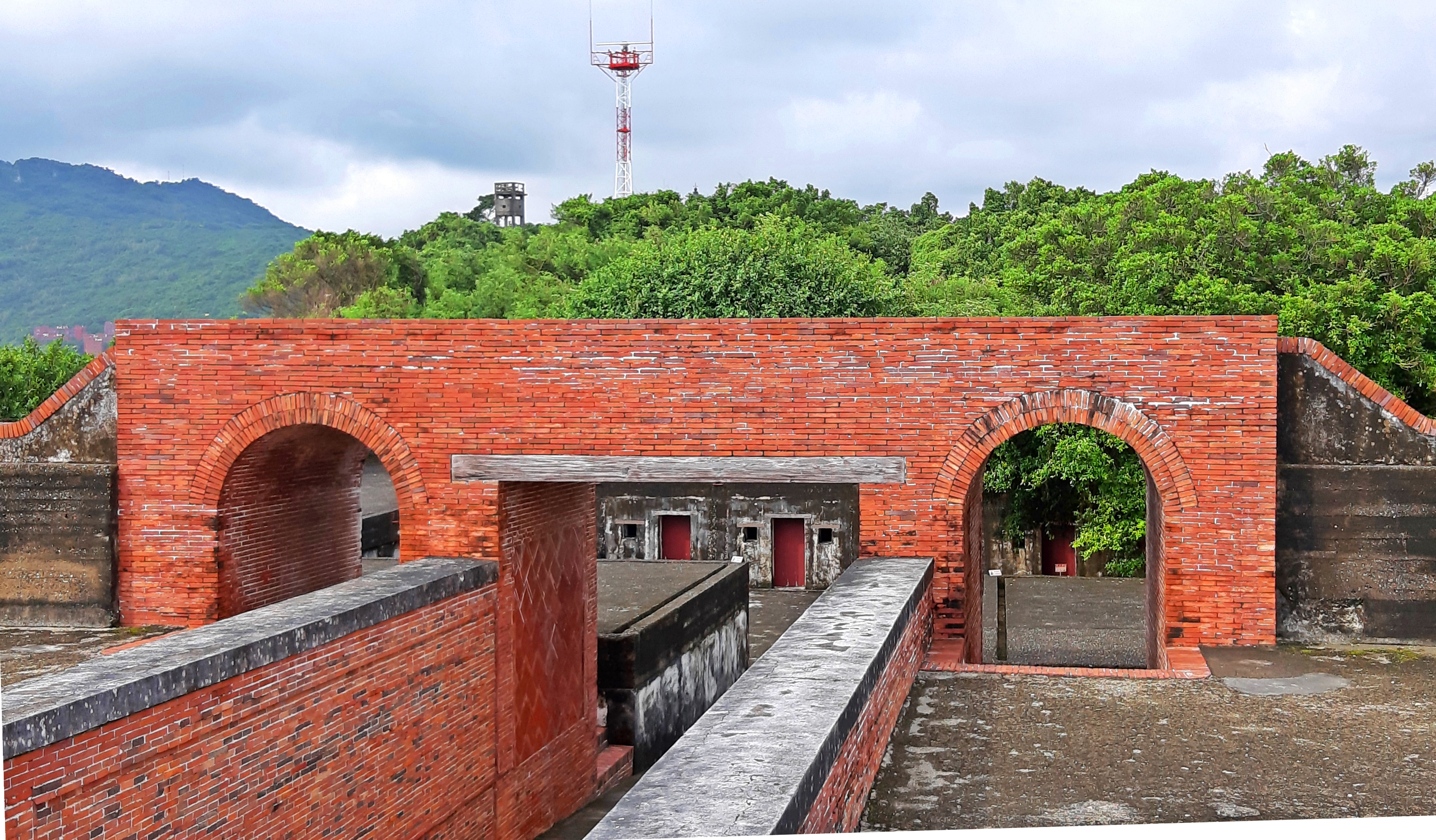
- Barracks and the gate to the battery

Site information
- Type: Fort

Location
- Coordinates: 22°36′47″N 120°15′51″E

Site history
- Built: 1720
- Built by: H. W. Harwood

Cihou Fort or Cihou Battery (Chinese: 旗後砲臺; Hanyu Pinyin: Qíhòu Pàotái; Tongyong Pinyin: Cíhòu Pàotái; Pe̍h-ōe-jī: Kî-āu Phàu-tâi) is a historic fort in Cijin District, Kaohsiung, Taiwan, formerly guarding the northern entrance to Kaohsiung Harbor.

== History ==
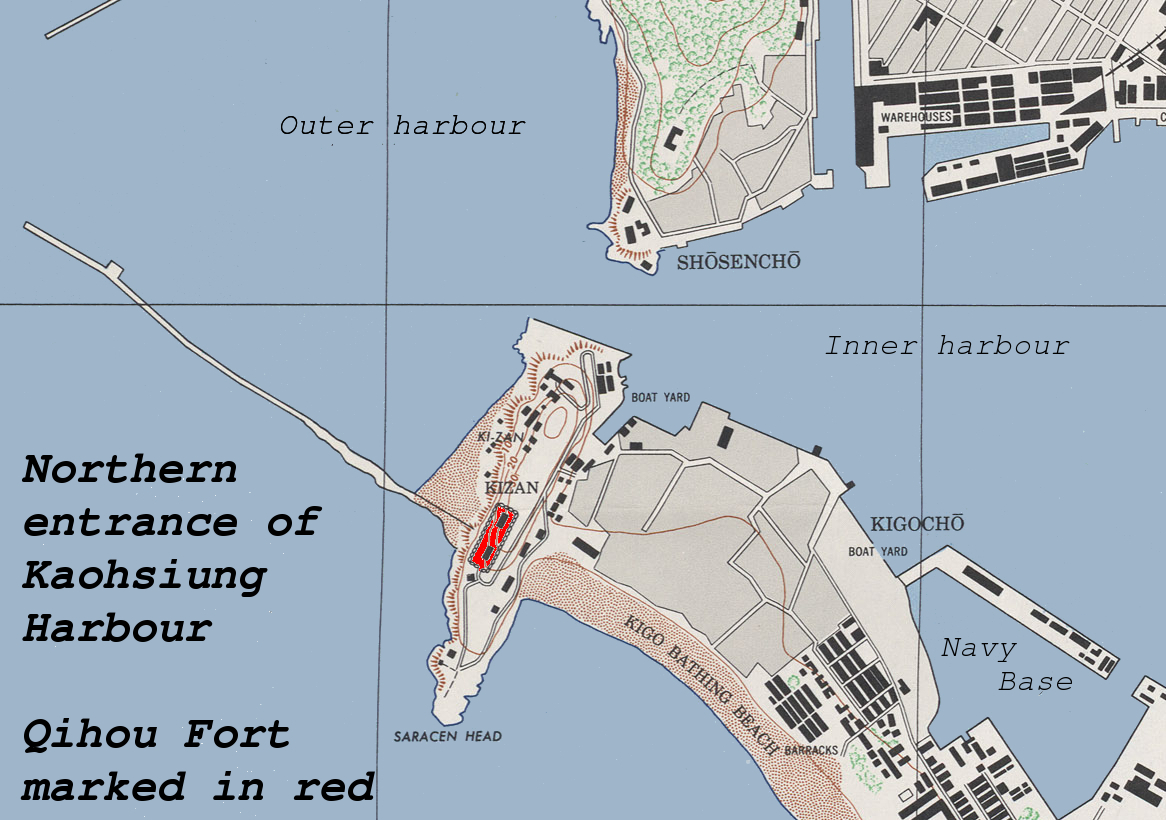
Location of the fort

The first fortifications were built in 1720 when Taiwan was ruled by the Manchu-led Qing Empire of China. After the Japanese expedition in 1874, the Qing authorities constructed a modern fort, which in 1880 had new Armstrong's guns installed. It played no part in the Sino-French War; the fighting in Taiwan took place around Keelung and during blockade French ships did not approach the port.

Taiwan was ceded to Japan according to the Treaty of Shimonoseki in the aftermath of the first Sino-Japanese war. The local troops, however, fought on. On 12 October 1895, an escadre commanded by admiral Arichi Shinanojo (cruisers Yoshino, Naniwa, Akitsushima, Yaeyama, Saien (ex Chinese Jiyuan, captured in Weihaiwei) and corvette Hiei) arrived at Takow (modern-day Kaohsiung) and prompted the foreigners to evacuate, as they would conduct the attack on the next day. The foreigners boarded the gunboat HMS Tweed and two tugs and withdrew (only to return once the fight was over). At 7 am, 13 October, Japanese ships "opened fire on the Takow forts at a range of about 6,000 yards. For the first half-hour, the forts responded, but after this their guns were silent...The forts fired twenty four rounds, the best shot being from the 8-inch B.L. Armstrong guns in Apes' Hill fort, which struck the water about 500 yards from the Naniwa Kan." The Japanese troops seized the forts in early afternoon, suffering no casualties (4 Chinese soldiers were killed).

During the Japanese era the fort was not used.

After World War II the hill was fortified by Chinese army: light gun and machine gun nests cut in the rock can still be found there.

== Construction ==
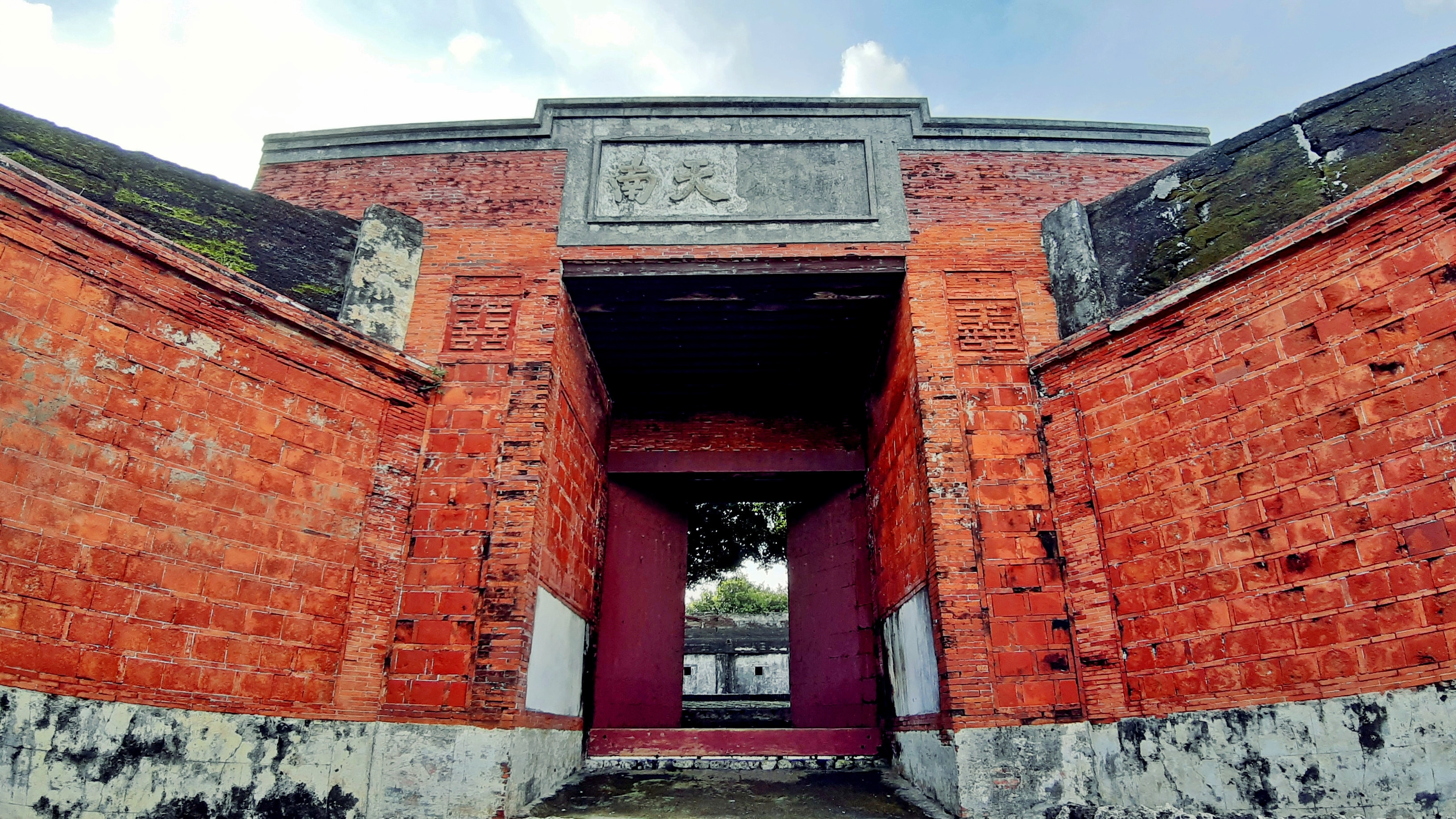
Gate to the battery

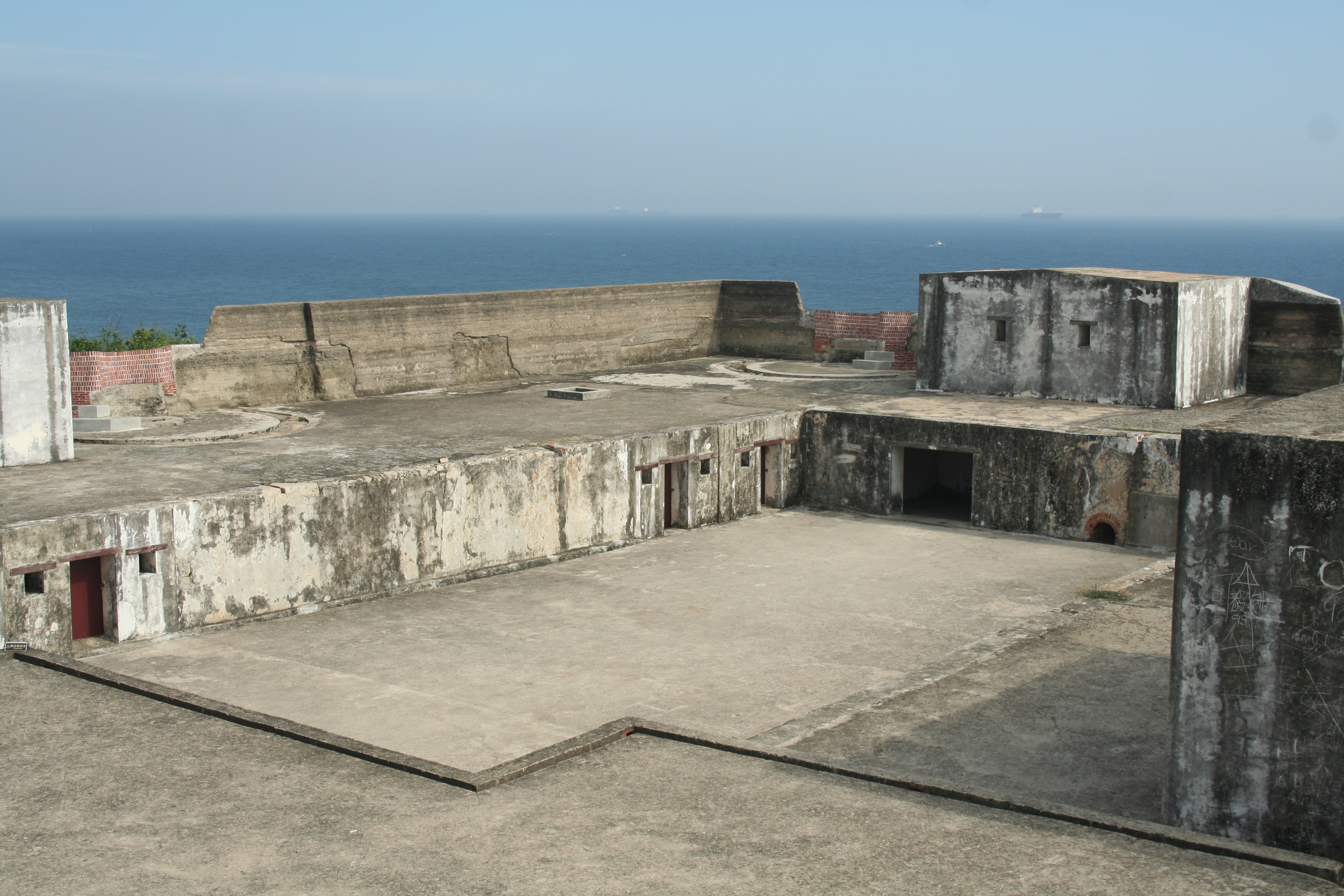
The battery with two visible emplacements overlooking Taiwan Strait

Planned by British engineer, H. W. Harwood, the fort consists of three parts:

- fortified barracks, around rectangular square, with close-defence parapet on the roof. Of the two gates, one leads to the battery, the other used to be a main southern gate. It bore a Chinese inscription, which could be translated as "Mighty blow to the South" – the characters for "mighty blow" were shot away by a shell from Yoshino. The rest, still visible, serve as ironic remainder of history.
- central command post
- main rectangular battery with four open emplacements (two facing west, one north and one south) for four Armstrong's 7 inch rifled muzzle-loaders (RML 7-inch 6½-ton), with bunkers for crews. Magazines are located on the lower level. Steep slopes of the Cihou hill served as fort's natural scarps.

Of the 19th-century fortification at the foot of the hill, only remainders are still visible.

== See also ==
- List of tourist attractions in Taiwan
- North Gate of Xiong Town
- History of Kaohsiung

== Bibliography ==
- Davidson, James W. (1903). The Island of Formosa, Past and Present : history, people, resources, and commercial prospects : tea, camphor, sugar, gold, coal, sulphur, economical plants, and other productions. London and New York: Macmillan. OL 6931635M.
