= Tamsui Foreign Cemetery =

Cemetery in New Taipei City, Taiwan

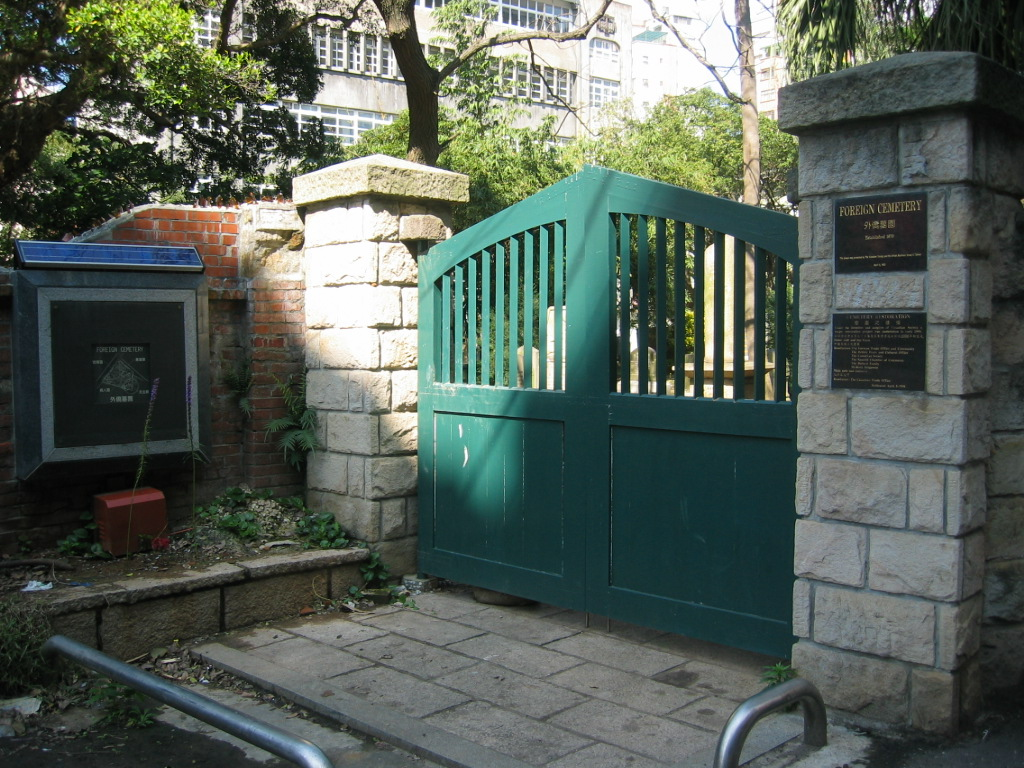

Details
- Established: 1860s
- Location: 251, New Taipei City, Tamsui District
- Country: Taiwan
- No. of graves: 80
- Find a Grave: Tamsui Foreign Cemetery

Tamsui Foreign Cemetery (Chinese: 淡水外僑墓園; pinyin: Dànshuǐ wàiqiáo mù yuán) is a cemetery located in New Taipei City, Taiwan. The cemetery has four separate sections, designated for protestants, catholics, merchants and traders, and government officials.

== History ==
The cemetery was established in the 1860s as a burial ground for foreign merchants who arrived at the Port of Taipei to participate in the opium trade, trading opium for tea and camphor. During the 1870s, the cemetery was administered Canadian Presbyterian Church in Taiwan under the direction of George Leslie Mackay. From the 1890s until 1972, the cemetery was operated by the British consulate in Taipei. In the years following, the cemetery was operated by Australian and American administrations until 1979.

in 1996, the Taipei County Government designated Tamsui Foreign Cemetery a heritage site.

Currently, the cemetery is under the administration of the Canadian Chamber of Commerce in Taiwan. Every year, many Canadian expatriates travel to the site to conduct tomb sweeping.

The cemetery is located next to Tamkang High School (Chinese: 淡江中學), which was founded by George Leslie Mackay's son, George William Mackay.
