= Taiwan International Ports Corporation =

Shipping company of Taiwan

Taiwan International Ports Corporation 臺灣港務公司
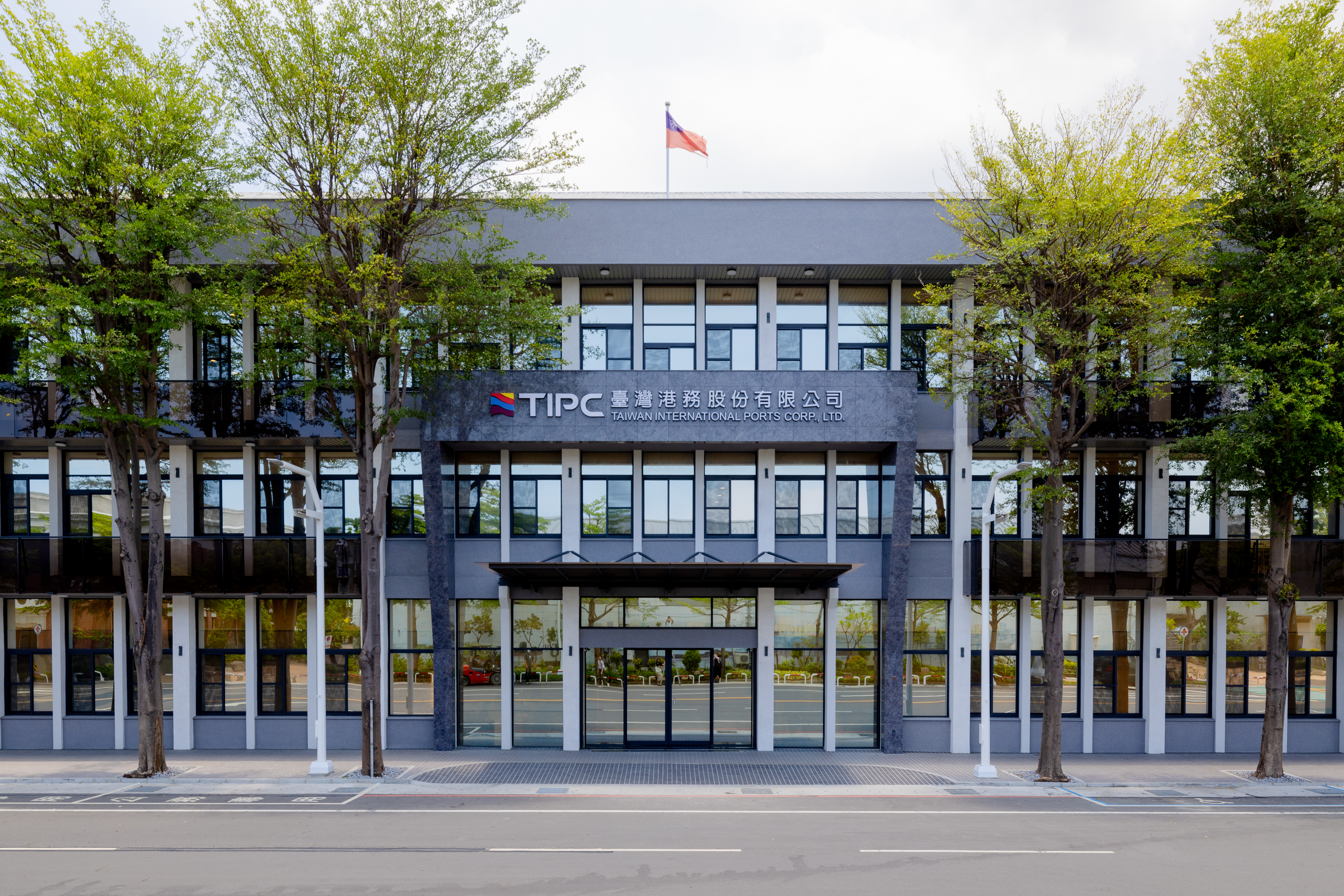
- Industry: shipping
- Founded: 1 March 2012
- Headquarters: Sanmin District, Kaohsiung, Taiwan
- Area served: Taiwan
- Key people: Lee Hsien-yi (Chairperson); Wang, Chin-Jung (President)
- Owner: Ministry of Transportation and Communications
- Website: Official website

The Taiwan International Ports Corporation (TIPC; traditional Chinese: 臺灣港務公司; simplified Chinese: 台湾港务公司; pinyin: Táiwān Gǎngwù Gōngsī) is a state-owned shipping company in Taiwan that operates ports in Taiwan.

== History ==
Under the Taiwan International Ports Corporation, Ltd. Establishment Act, the company was founded on March 1, 2012.

According to the act, the Ministry of Transportation and Communications would merge the port operations of Keelung Harbor Bureau, Taichung Harbor Bureau, Kaohsiung Harbor Bureau and Hualien Harbor Bureau, to form the Taiwan International Ports Corporation.

The remaining operations of the four Harbor Bureaus, mainly concerning maritime administration, would be integrated to form the new Maritime and Port Bureau.

== Organizational structure ==
- Public Affairs Department
- Legal Affairs Department
- Secretariat Department
- Accounting Department
- Civil Service Ethics Department
- Human Resources Department
- Harbor Crags Operation Department
- Construction Management/Engineering Department
- Occupational Safety Department
- Information Technology Department
- Finance Department
- Marketing and Logistics Department
- Port Business Department
- Planning and Development Department

== Ports ==
- Port of Keelung
- Port of Kaohsiung
- Port of Taichung
- Port of Hualien
- Port of Taipei
- Port of Su'ao
- Port of Anping

== Transportation ==
TIPC headquarter office is accessible within walking distance South of Kaohsiung Station of Taiwan Railway.

== See also ==
- List of companies of Taiwan
