= Port of Keelung =

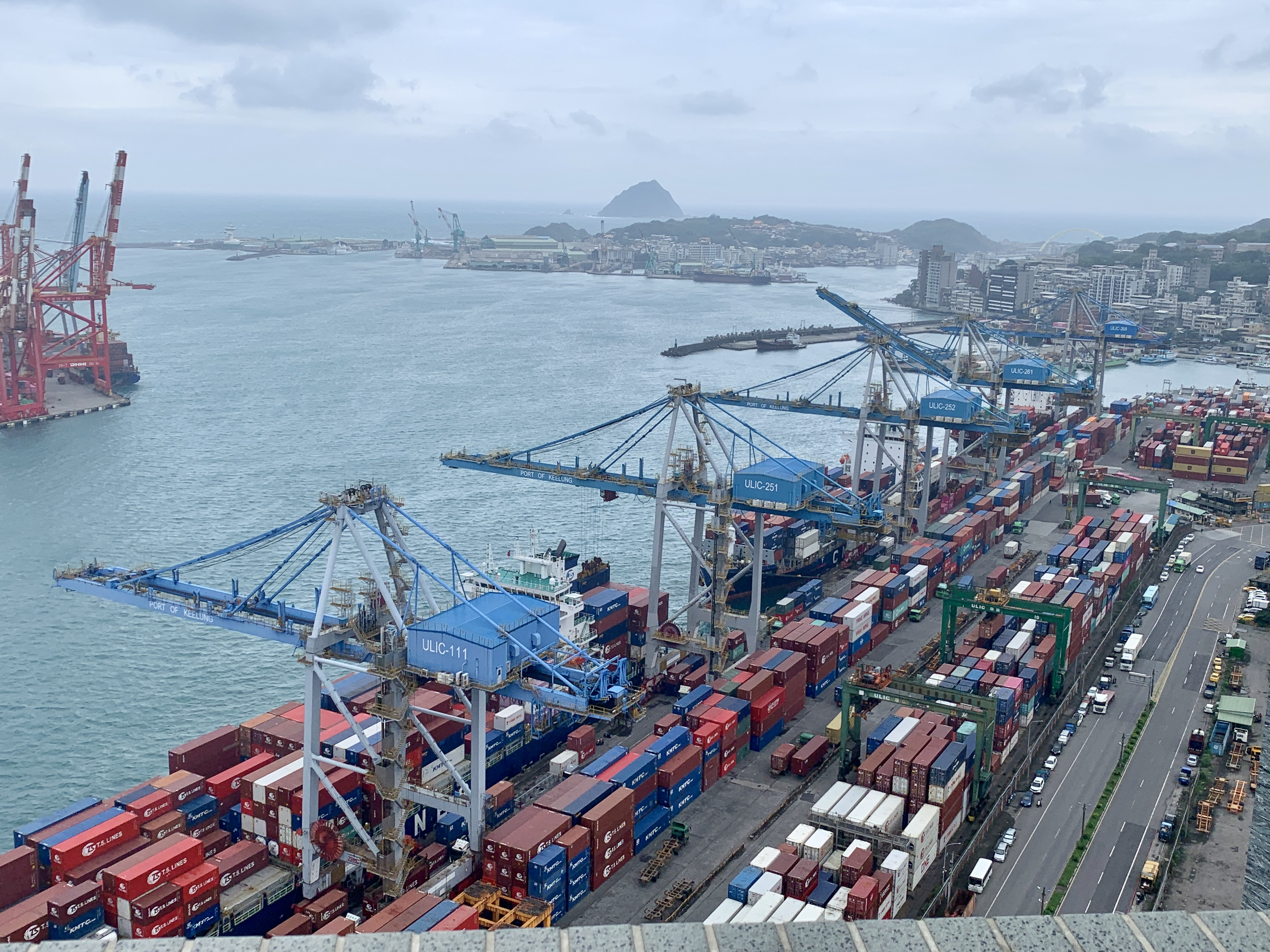
- Interactive map of Port of Keelung
- Location within Taiwan
- Native name: 基隆港

Location
- Location: Keelung, Taiwan
- Coordinates: 25.131°N 121.743°E
- UN/LOCODE: TWKEL

Details
- Operated by: Taiwan International Ports Corporation
- Type of Harbor: Port

Statistics
- Website kl.twport.com.tw

The Port of Keelung (Chinese: 基隆港; Hanyu Pinyin: Jīlóng gǎng; Tongyong Pinyin: Jilóng Gǎng; Wade–Giles: Chi-lung-kang; Pe̍h-ōe-jī: Ke-lâng-káng), also known as Keelung Harbor, is located in the vicinity of Keelung City, Taiwan. It is operated by Taiwan International Ports Corporation, Taiwan's state-owned port management company.

== History ==
The Port of Keelung opened in 1886. During the Japanese colonial administration, the Government-General of Taiwan started the development of Keelung Harbor. By the early and middle 20th century, it was the largest port in Taiwan at the time. The Port of Keelung brought prosperity to the city of Keelung, with Keelung growing into the 4th largest city in Taiwan (after Taipei, Tainan, Kaohsiung).

Following the defeat of the Japanese in the Second World War, the Japanese army retreated from Taiwan through the Port of Keelung. It was also the main port through which Chinese officials entered Taiwan to take over Taiwan from Japan. With the rapid economic growth in Taiwan during the 1960s-70s, the Port of Keelung became one of the busiest ports in the world. In 1984, Port of Keelung was the 7th busiest cargo port in the world.

== Architecture ==
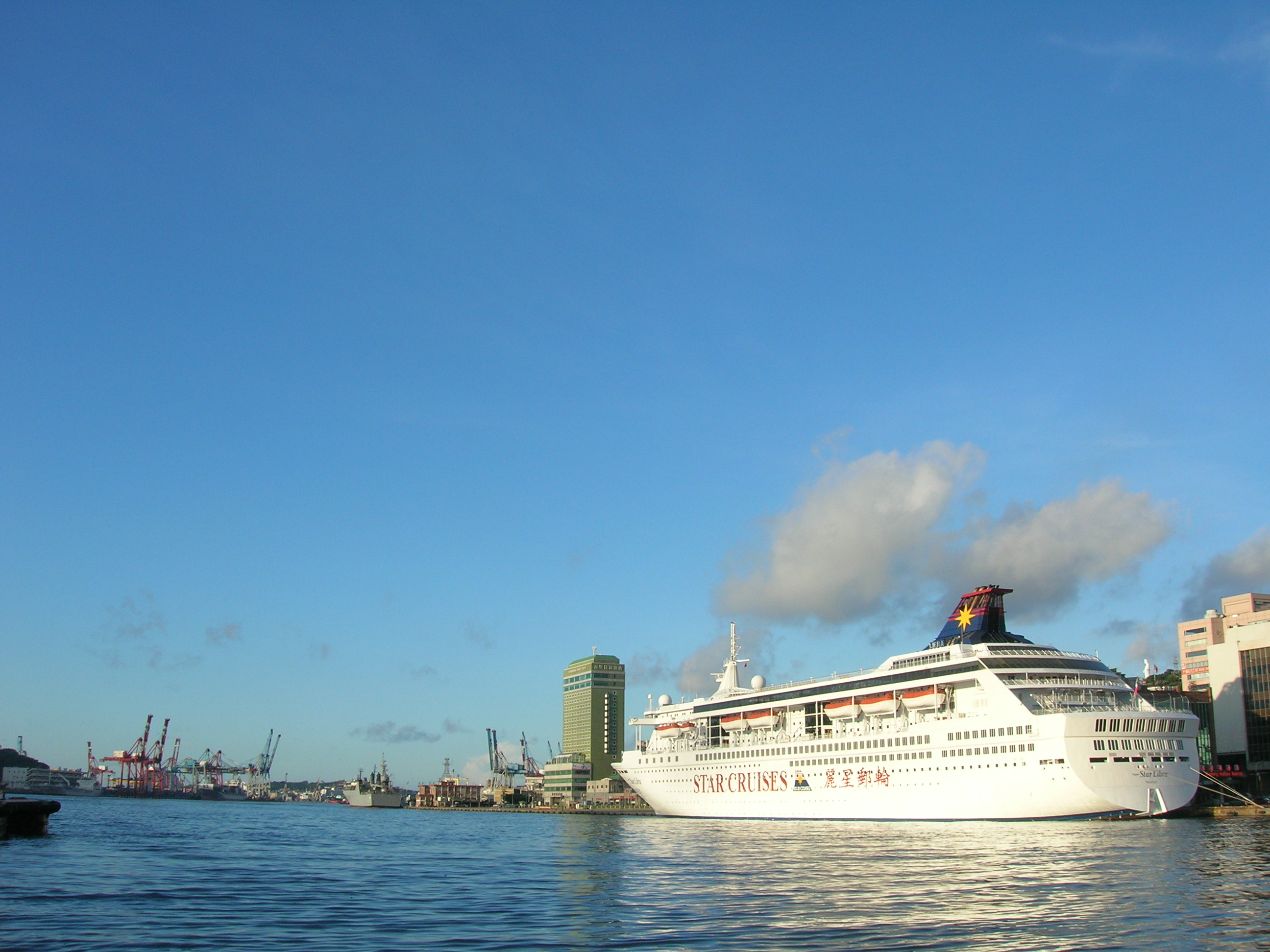
Cruise ship at the Port of Keelung

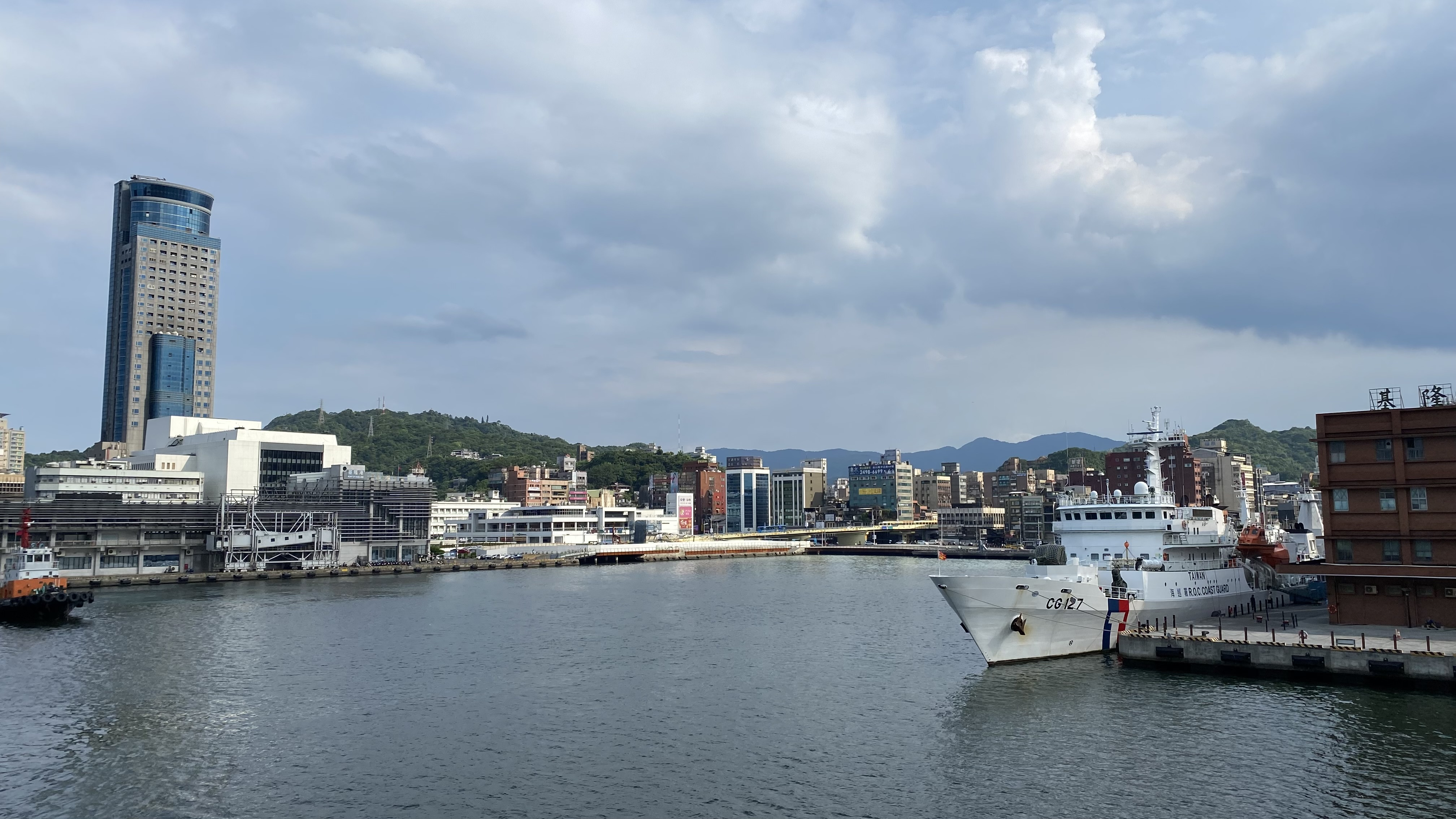
Keelung inner harbor

The port forms a narrow waterway with approximately 2,000 meters in length and 400 meters in width that extends from the inner harbor in the southwest to the port mouth in the northwest.

== Destinations ==
The port serves destinations to the Matsu Islands, Xiamen, Okinawa and Keelung Islet.

== Transportation ==
The Port of Keelung is accessible from Keelung Station of Taiwan Railway.

== See also ==
- Keelung
- Santisima Trinidad (Taiwan)
- List of East Asian ports
- Transportation in Taiwan
- Maritime industries of Taiwan
- Port of Kaohsiung
- Port of Taipei
