= Port of Taipei =

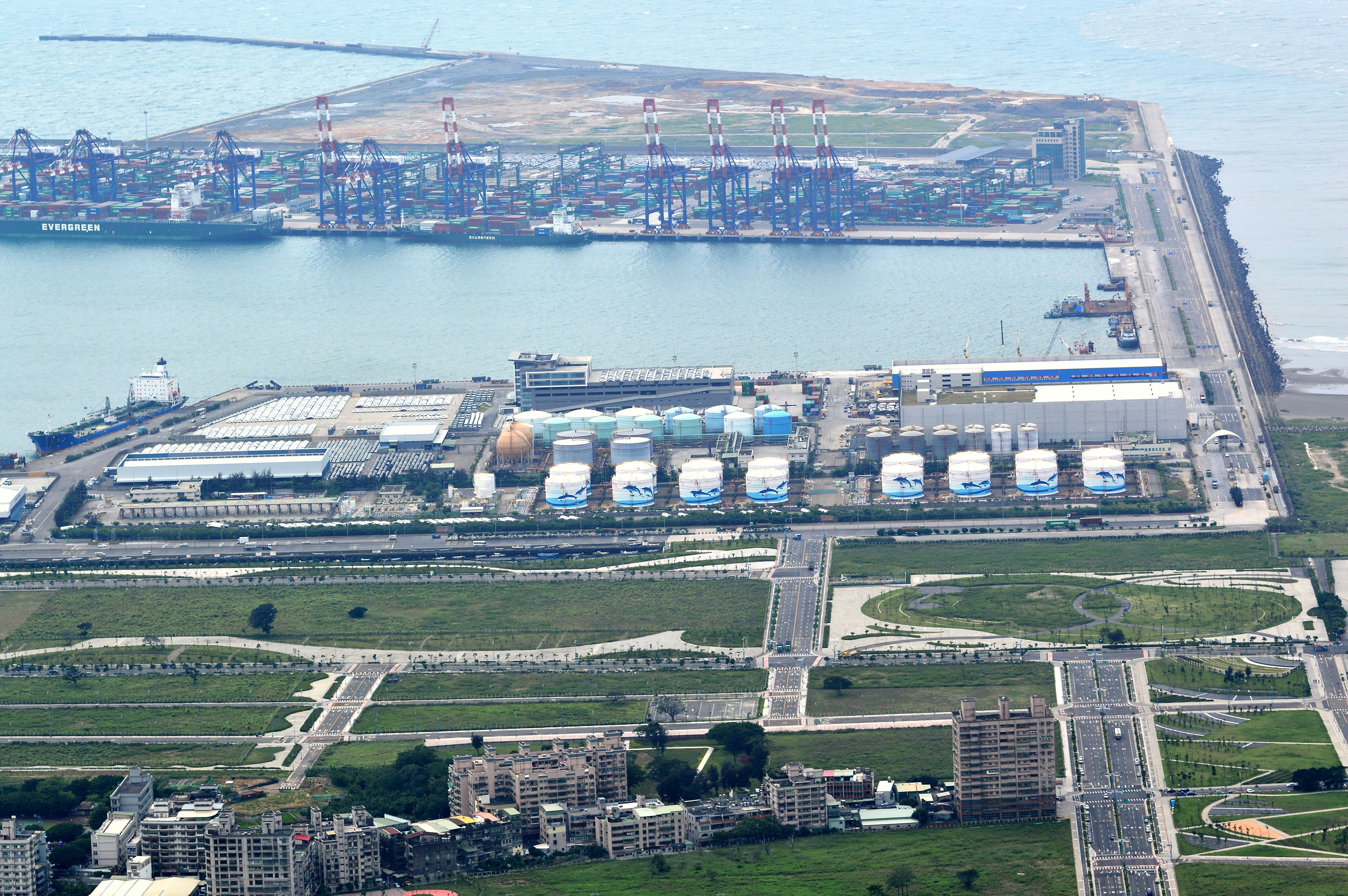
- Interactive map of Port of Taipei
- Location within Taiwan
- Native name: 臺北港

Location
- Location: New Taipei, Taiwan
- Coordinates: 25°09′41.62″N 121°21′7.71″E
- UN/LOCODE: TWTPE

Details
- Operated by: Taiwan International Ports Corporation
- Type of Harbor: Port

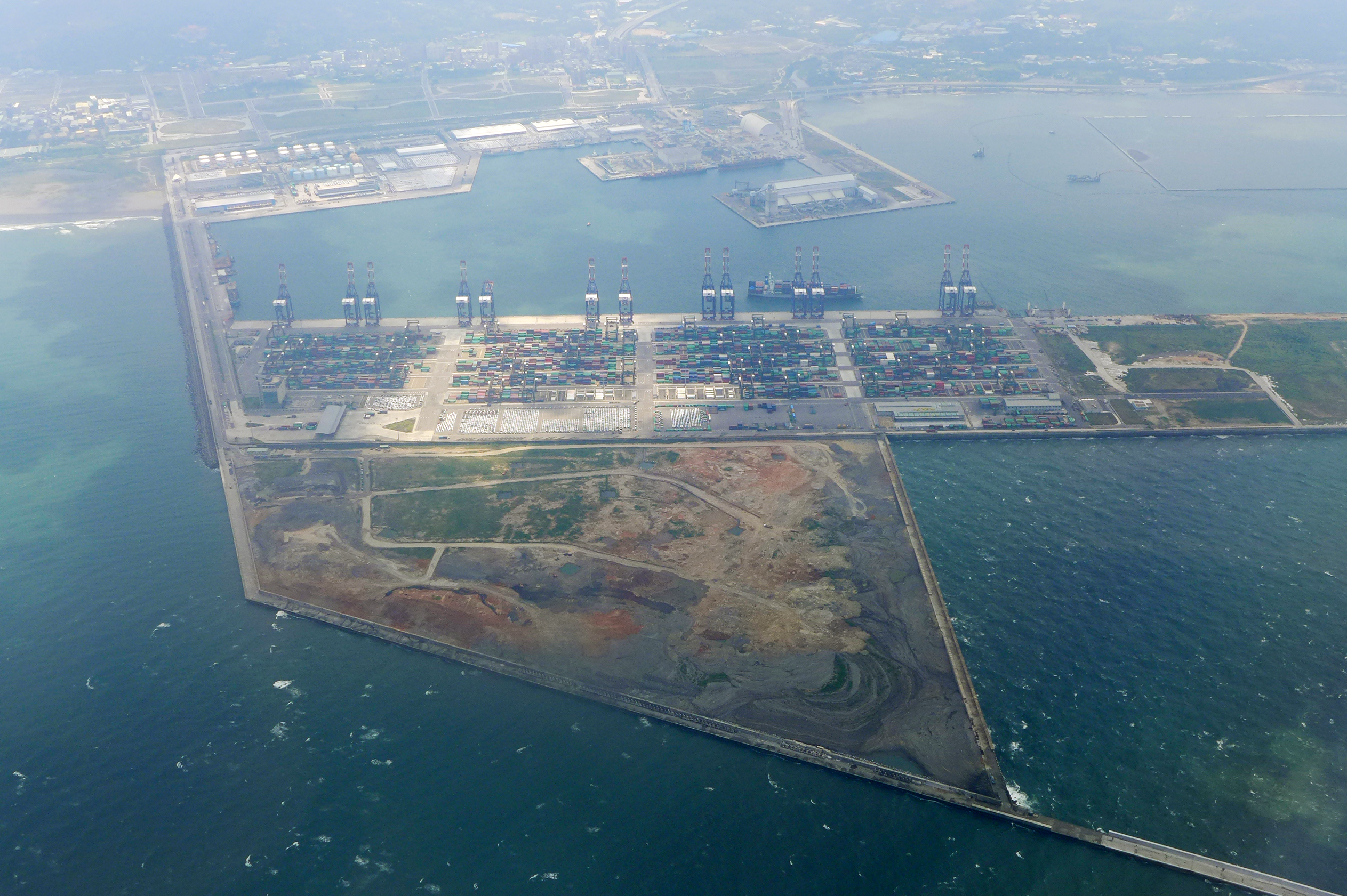
Aerial view of the Port of Taipei

The Port of Taipei or Taipei Harbor (Chinese: 臺北港; pinyin: Táiběi Gǎng) is a port in Bali District, New Taipei, Taiwan, and is the country's newest international port. Phase I of the project was initiated by Port of Tamsui in 1993 and completed in 1998. Government and private investors have cooperated on Phase II construction since July 1996. Phase II will utilize a water area of 2,833 hectares and a land area of 269 hectares, for a total of 3,102 hectares. The port was scheduled to be completed in 2011. Estimates anticipate annual volumes by that date of 4,000,000 TEU, superseding the current volume of the Keelung Port.

== History ==
A NT$1.35 billion (US$46.65 million) dredging project began in February 2011 to increase the depths of the port's fairway and turning basins to between 16 and 17.5 meters, to increase capacity and competitiveness.

In May of 2019 the Port of Taipei was the site of major counter-terror and chemical response drills. The drills were attended by Taiwanese President Tsai Ing-wen.

== See also ==
- Transportation in Taiwan
- Maritime industries of Taiwan
- Port of Keelung
- Port of Kaohsiung
