= Port of Kaohsiung =

Port in Kaohsiung, Taiwan

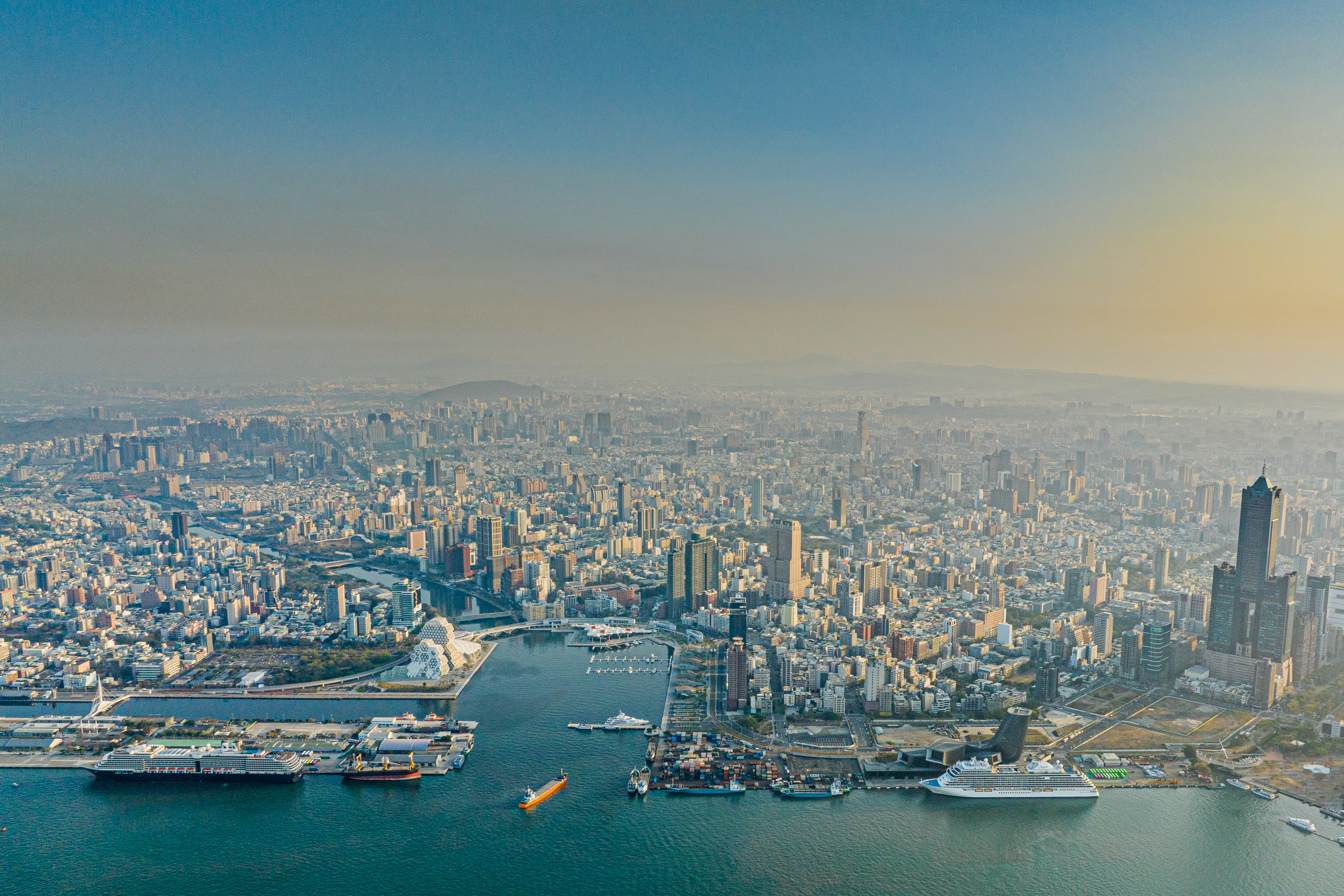
- Interactive map of Port of Kaohsiung
- Location within Kaohsiung
- Native name: 高雄港 (Chinese)

Location
- Country: Taiwan
- Location: Kaohsiung
- Coordinates: 22°36′48″N 120°16′45″E

Details
- Opened: 1858
- Operated by: Port of Kaohsiung Branch, Taiwan International Ports Corporation
- Owned by: Ministry of Transportation and Communications
- No. of wharfs: 116

Statistics
- Annual container volume: 10.27 million TEU (2017)
- Website; Official website

The Port of Kaohsiung (POK; Chinese: 高雄港; pinyin: Gāoxióng Gǎng; Wade–Giles: Kao^{1}-hsiung^{2} Kang^{3}; Pe̍h-ōe-jī: Ko-hiông-káng) is the largest harbor in Taiwan, handling approximately 10.26 million twenty-foot equivalent units (TEU) worth of cargo in 2015. The port is located in southern Taiwan, adjacent to Kaohsiung City, and surrounded by the city districts of Gushan, Yancheng, Lingya, Cianjhen, Siaogang, as well as Cijin. It is operated by Taiwan International Ports Corporation, Taiwan's state-owned harbor management company.

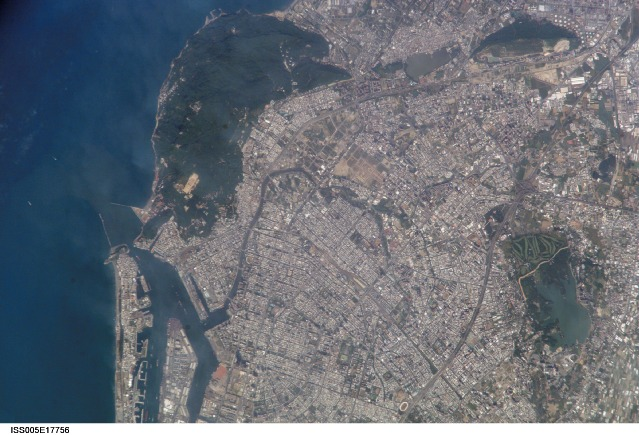
The first entrance

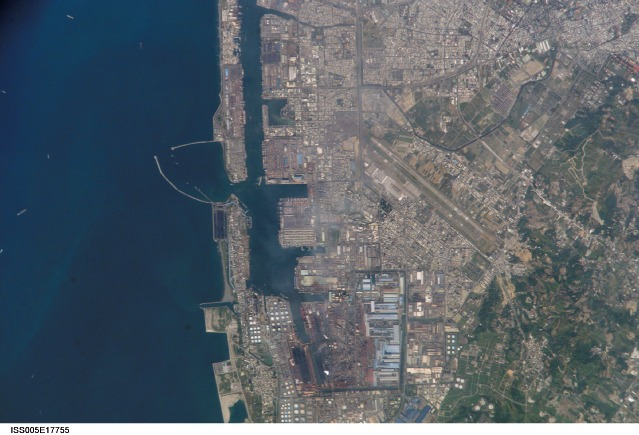
The second entrance

== History ==
The port was a natural lagoon before eventually developed through into a modern harbor over the period of several hundred years. At the time of 16th century, some villages had already established on the seashore of the present-day Kaohsiung, which was called as "Takau" by natives at that time. The colonists of Dutch East India Company (VOC) arrived at Takau in 1620s and then began to develop the lagoon. The port, historically referred to as the "Takau Port" (Chinese: 打狗港; Pe̍h-ōe-jī: Tá-káu-káng), developed gradually during the Dutch Era, Koxinga Era, and the early Qing Dynasty.

=== Qing Empire ===
In 1858, the Qing Dynasty lost the Second Opium War to the French-British and signed the Treaties of Tianjin. According to the treaties, the Qing's government was asked to open five ports of Taiwan for foreign trade. As one of the five ports, Takao Port had officially opened to the western traders since 1864. Afterward, the Qing's government ceded Taiwan to Japanese in 1895 after losing First Sino-Japanese War.

=== Empire of Japan ===
In the early Japanese era, the colonial government decided to undertake large projects with the intention to develop the port into a modern harbor. Japanese built the port up in three stages, the first was finished in 1908, the second in 1912, and the third was halted half way at the start of World War II. During World War II, the port was heavily bombed by the western Allies.

=== After the war II ===
After the war, restarted development of the port. The "second port" was built in 1975 by breaking the land bridge between Siaogang and Cijin.

At the southern side of the second port entrance, a museum and park currently stands nearby the recently established Intercontinental Terminal (No. 6 Terminal). This museum describes the history and clearance of a significantly sized residential community which was situated nearby to the expanded port.

The port is part of the Maritime Silk Road that runs from the Chinese coast towards the southern tip of India to Mombasa, from there through the Suez Canal to the Mediterranean and there to the Upper Adriatic region of Trieste with its rail connections to Central and Eastern Europe.

In 2017, Taiwan International Ports Corporation has completed the expensive expansion of Port of Kaohsiung and added new facilities to advance both container and passenger throughput.

The Port of Kaohsiung expanded its passenger service facilities with the introduction of a new mobile and adjustable passenger bridge to facilitate passenger embarkation and disembarkation from large cruise ships, such as Star Cruises' SuperStar Virgo. The new passenger three-level bridge can move up and down to match the different heights of cruise ship hatches to a maximum height of eight meters. It has also completed an air-conditioned, enclosed corridor linking the cruise-ship wharf to the International Travel Center.

Ongoing efforts by the Taiwan International Ports Corporation have resulted in growth for the port's cruise business. An estimated 127,000 cruise passengers are expected to visit the Port of Kaohsiung in 2017. A cruise ship terminal was opened in 2023.

The port's ferry terminal is also being expanded. In 2017, over 530,000 passengers traveled on the Budai–Penghu route during the tourist season, a 5.4 percent increase over the same period in the previous year. In order to accommodate the increase in transit passengers, the port is renovating its existing passenger service center. The ferry pier is also being extended so that it will be able to berth two ferries of over 500mt simultaneously, giving Port of Budai sufficient wharf space to concurrently berth up to nine ferries.

== Accidents and incidents ==
- In 2018, a big cargo ship the Chinese Steel Innovator crashed into the rear of the Evergreen Ever Laden as it was arriving. No deaths or injuries were reported.
- On 3 June 2021, a docking ship operated by OOCL hit another ship and container crane and caused it to collapse. Another crane was damaged although it did not collapse.

== Map of the port ==
= Industry Area; = Container Docks; = Bulk and Sundry Goods Docks; = Warehouse Exchange Area; = Fishery Harbor; = Commercial Area; = Naval Base

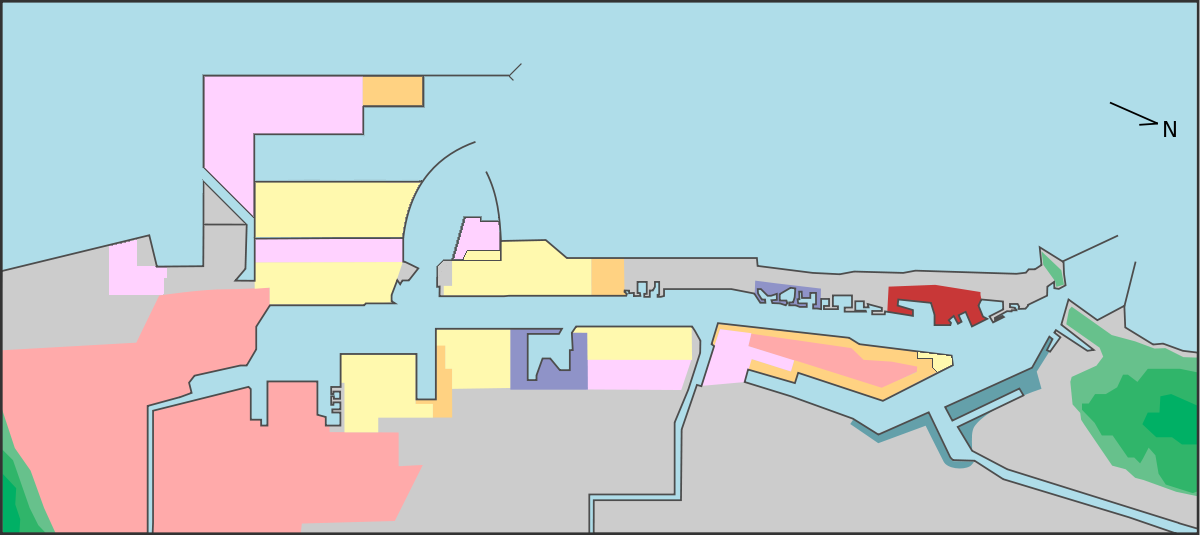

== Gallery ==
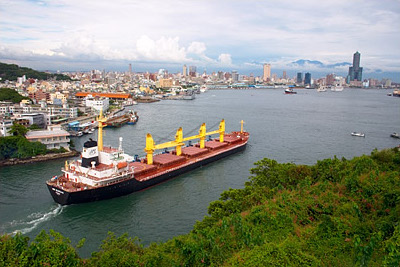
A ship passing the first port

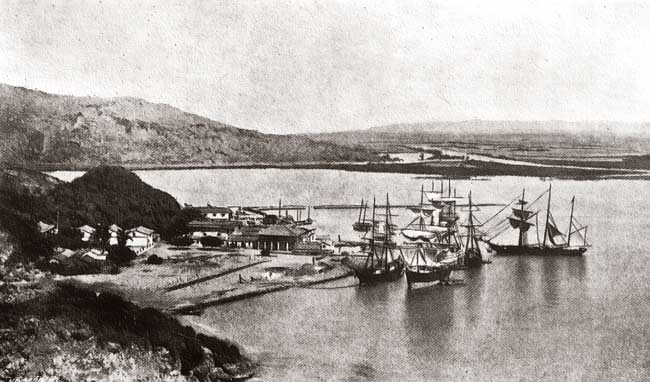
Takau port, 1897

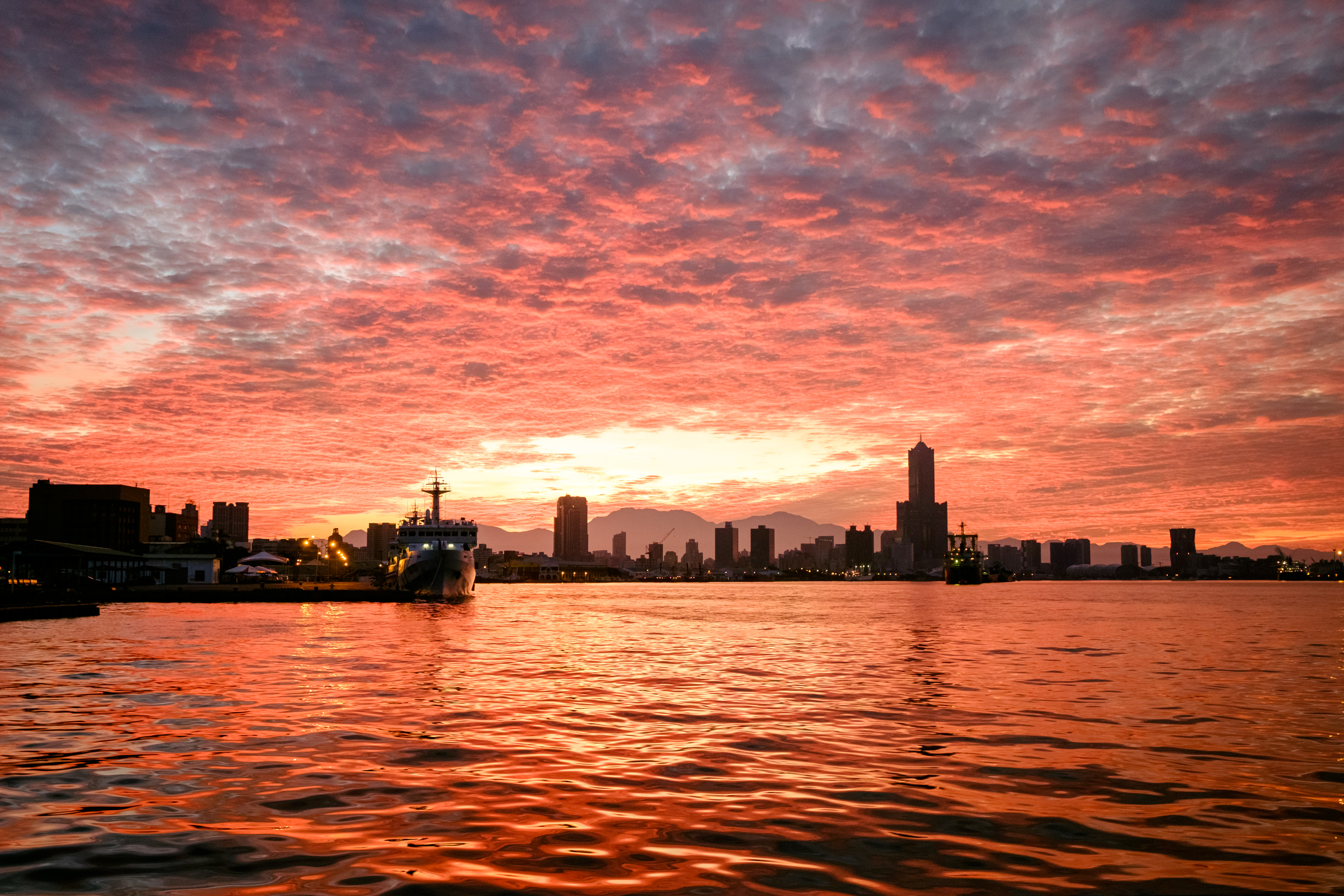
Sunrise at Kaohsiung harbour viewed from a ferry

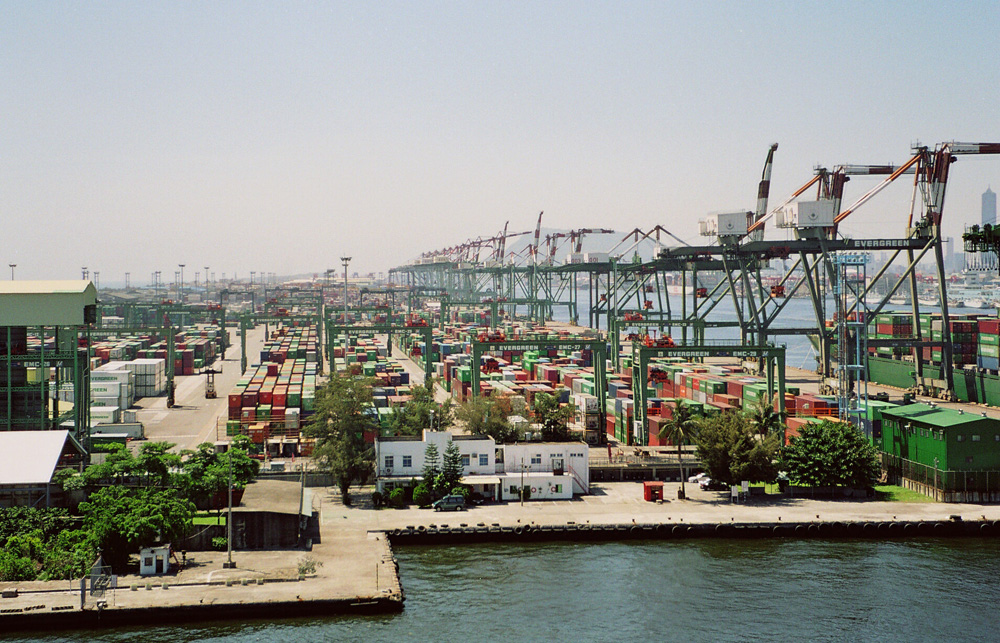
A container processing zone

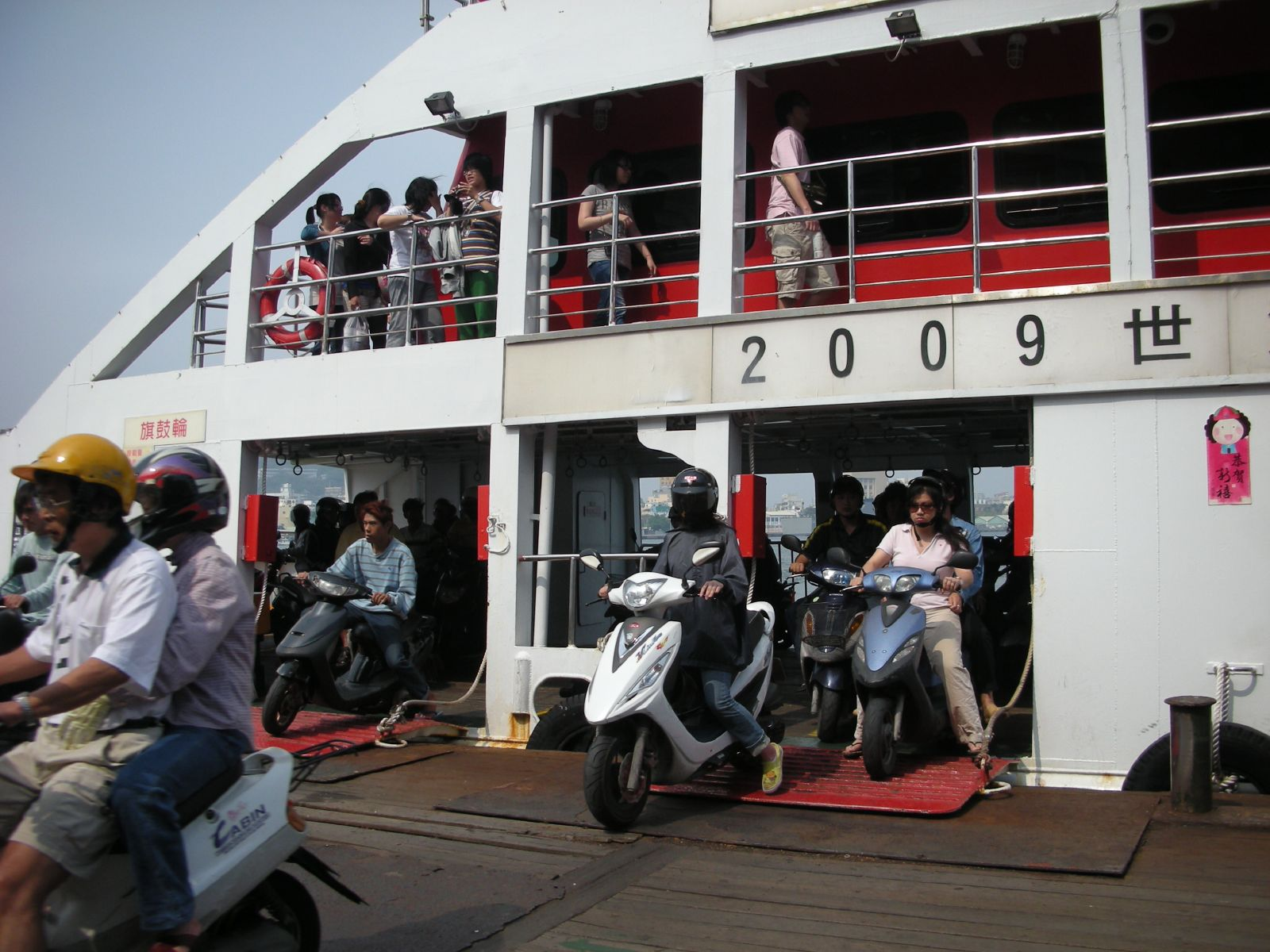
A ferryboat

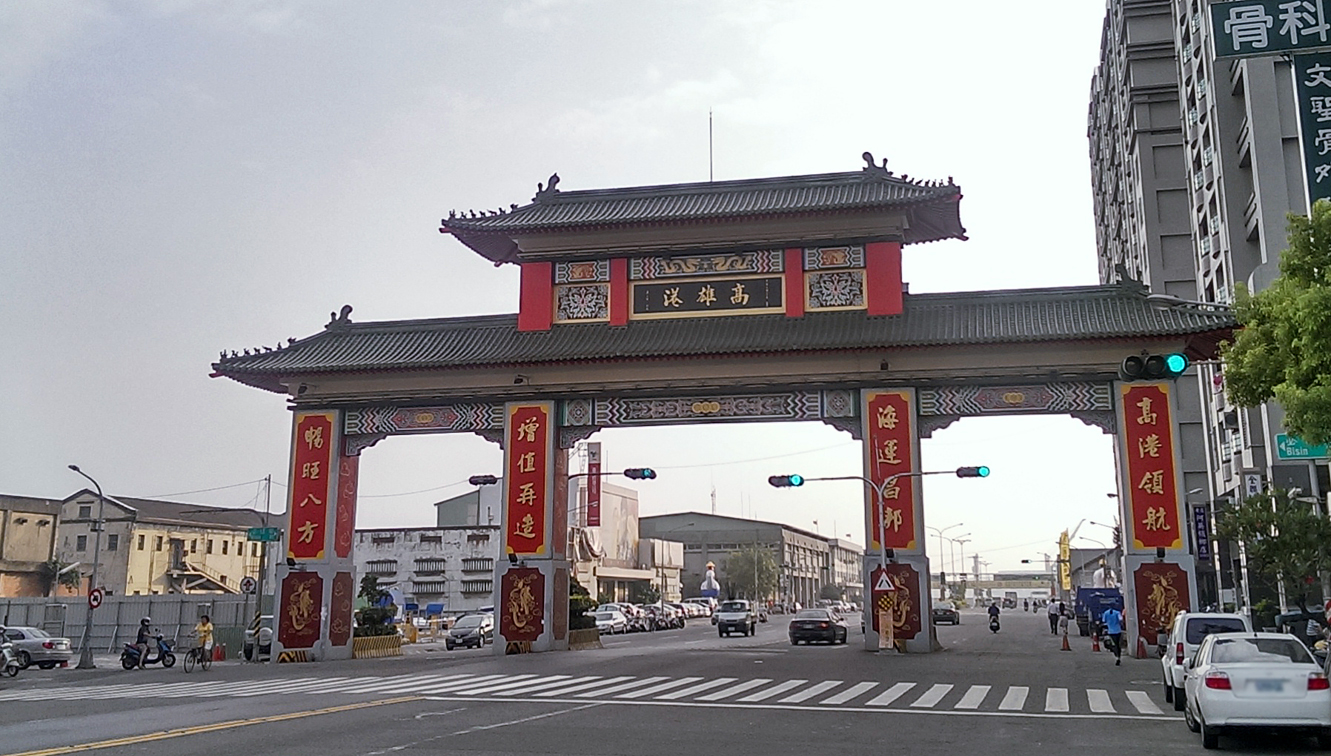
Entrance gate to Port of Kaohsiung

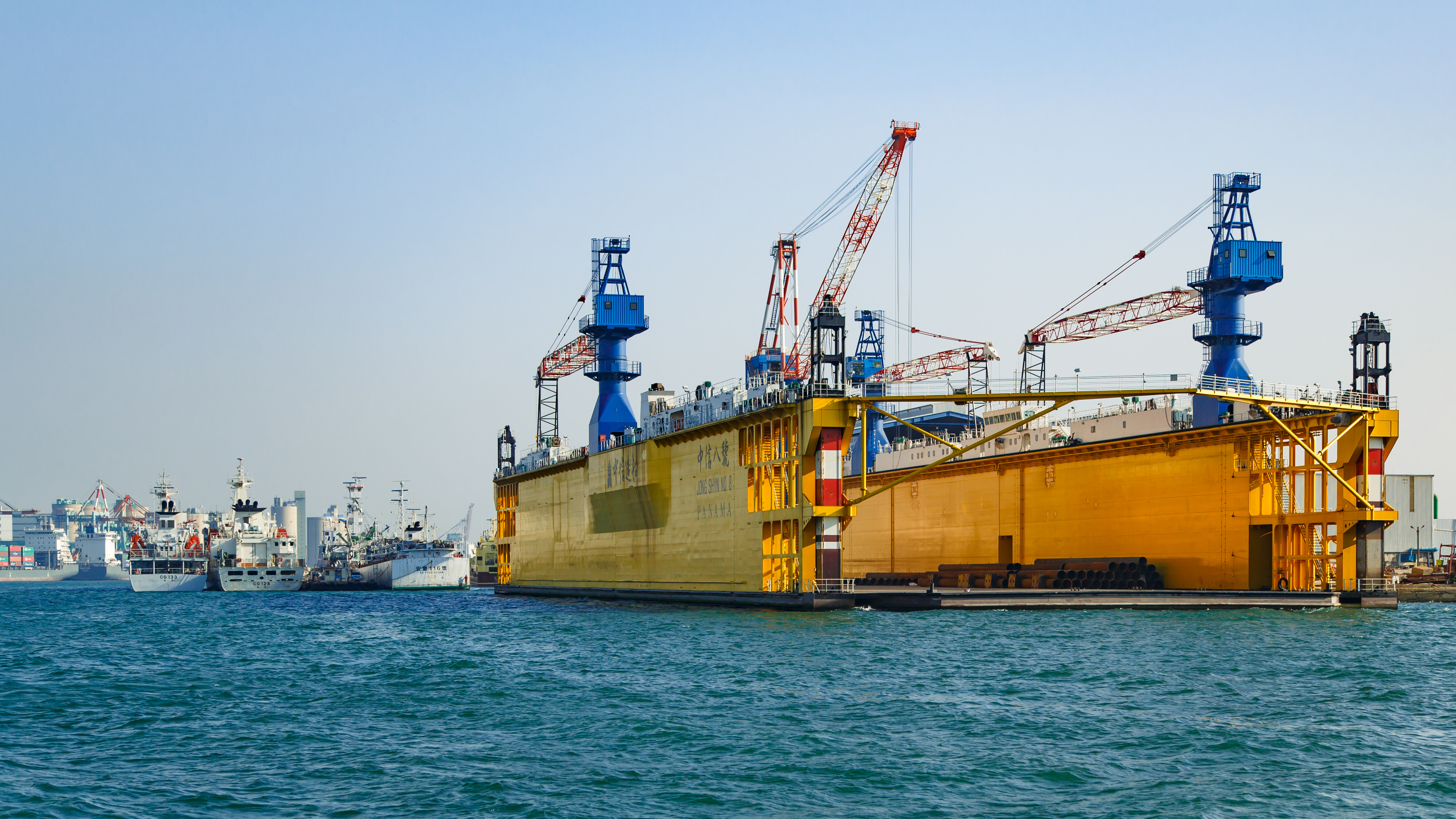
Floating drydock Jong Shyn No. 8 in Port of Kaohsiung

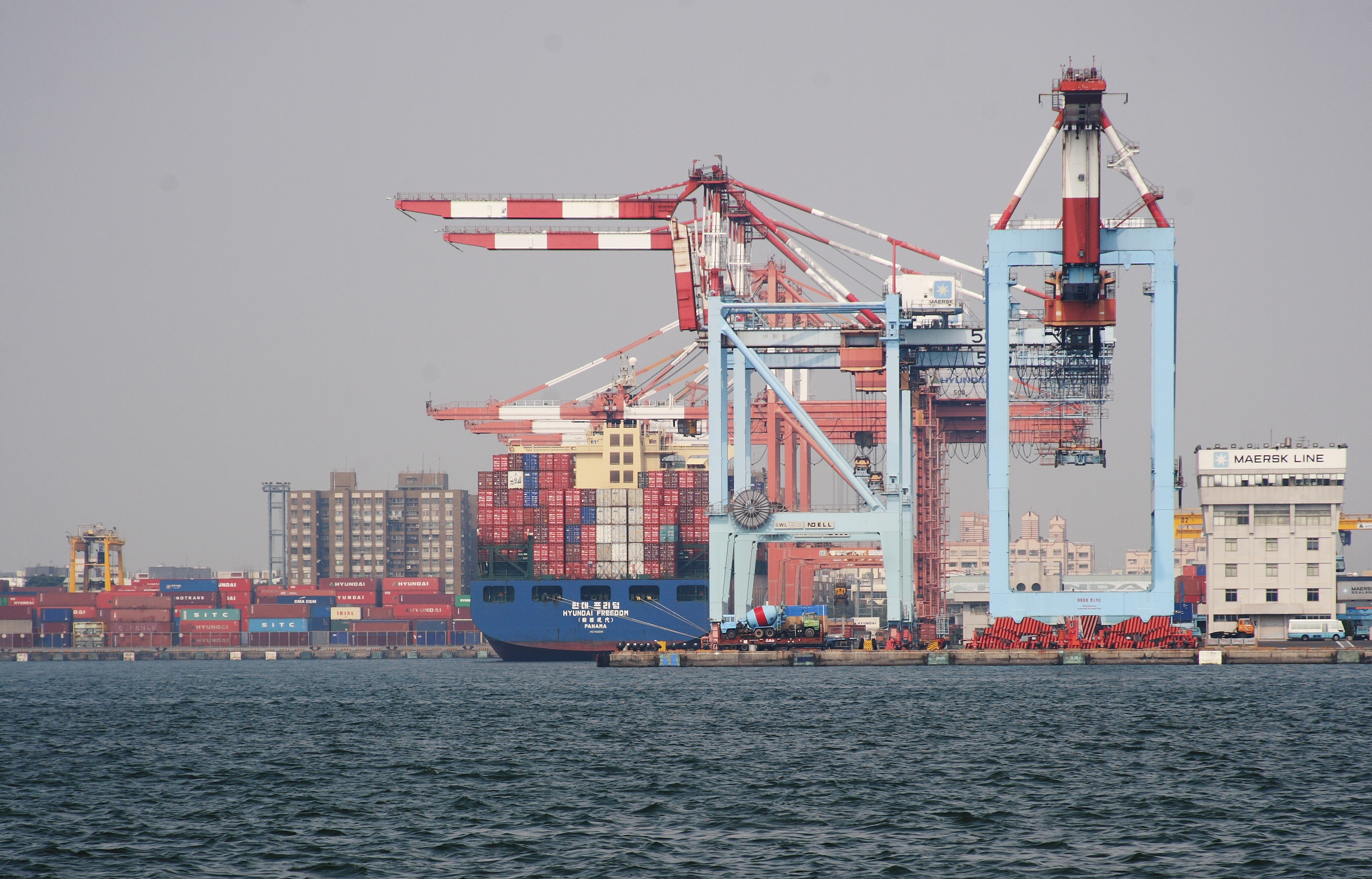
Shipping containers in Kaohsiung Harbor

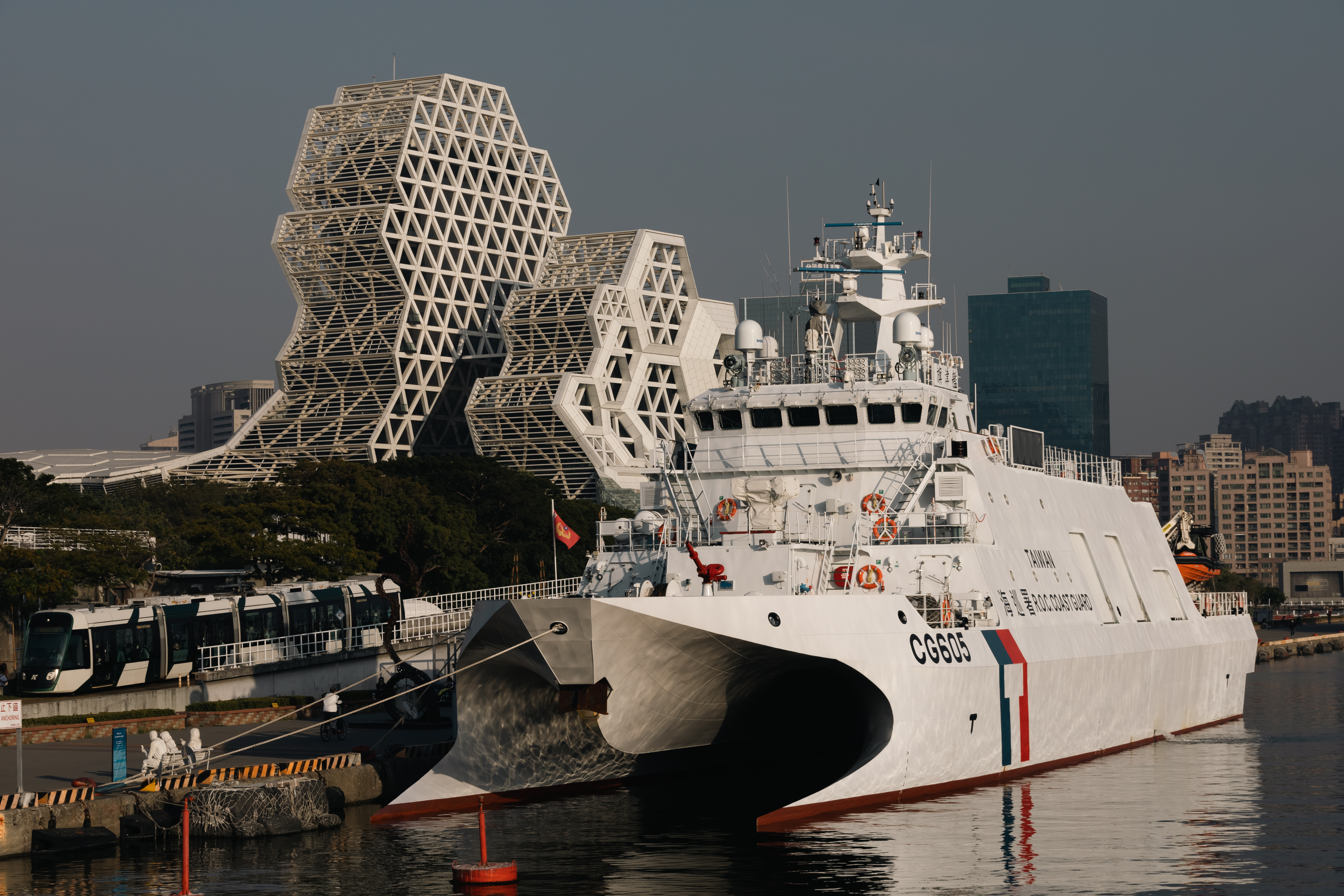
Anping-class offshore patrol vessel of the Coast Guard Administration in front of the Kaohsiung Music Center

== See also ==
- List of East Asian ports
- Taiwan International Ports Corporation
- Maritime industries of Taiwan
- Port of Keelung
- Port of Taipei
