= Li family =

Li family or Lee family may refer to:

- Lee family, family of American politicians

== Modern Asia ==
- Lee family (Singapore), family of Singaporean politicians
- Li Shek-pang family, Hong Kong banking family
- Li Ka-shing family, Hong Kong business family
- Eight Li brothers from 20th-century China
- Cantonese family that runs the company Lee Kum Kee

== Martial arts ==
- Li family kung fu, a style of kung fu
- Lee-style tai chi, a style of tai chi

== Chinese history ==
- Ruling family of Cheng Han (304–347)
- House of Li, ruling family of the Western Liang (400–421) and Tang (618–690, 705–907) dynasties
- Ruling family of Jin (Later Tang precursor) (896–923) and Later Tang (923–937)
- Ruling family of Southern Tang (937–976)
- Ruling family of Dingnan Jiedushi from 881 to 1038 and Western Xia (1038–1227)

== Vietnamese history ==
Lý (李) can also be romanized as Lí

- Two of the three rulers of Former Lý (544–602)
- Ruling family of the Lý dynasty (1009–1225)

== Korean history ==
Yi (李, 이) can also be romanized as Li (리)

- House of Yi, ruling family of Joseon and Korean Empire from 1392 to 1910

== See also ==
- Li (surname)
- Li (surname 李)
- Li (disambiguation)
- Li Family Historical Residence, Gushan District, Kaohsiung, Taiwan
- Lee's Family Reunion, 2010–2011 Taiwanese TV series
- House of Lê (Lê is the Sino-Vietnamese reading of 黎 Lí)
