= Teresa Teng Memorial Hall =

Former memorial hall in Gushan, Kaohsiung, Taiwan

- 鄧麗君紀念文物館
- Interactive map of the Teresa Teng Memorial Hall area

General information
- Type: memorial hall
- Location: Gushan, Kaohsiung, Taiwan
- Opening: April 2010

Technical details
- Floor area: 825 m^{2}

The Teresa Teng Memorial Hall (traditional Chinese: 鄧麗君紀念文物館; simplified Chinese: 邓丽君纪念文物馆; pinyin: Dèng Lìjūn Jìniàn Wénwùguǎn) was a memorial hall in Gushan District, Kaohsiung, Taiwan dedicated to singer Teresa Teng.

== History ==
The memorial hall was opened in April 2010.

== Architecture ==
The memorial hall building was located within the warehouse area along the Love River with a total area of 825 m^{2} equipped with a souvenir shop.

== Exhibitions ==
The memorial hall displayed many of her personal belongings, such as car, jewellery, mahjong table etc.

== See also ==
- List of tourist attractions in Taiwan
