= Kaohsiung City Steamship =

Ferry company based in Kaohsiung, Taiwan

Kaohsiung City Shipping Co., Ltd.
- Native name: 高雄市輪船公司
- Company type: Private, State-owned
- Industry: Water transport
- Founded: July 26, 2004; 21 years ago
- Headquarters: Sinsing District, Kaohsiung, Taiwan
- Number of employees: 4,900
- Website: kcs.kcg.gov.tw/en

Kaohsiung City Steamship is a ship operating company in Kaohsiung, Taiwan. The company operates two ferry routes and several cruise lines.

== Lines ==
=== Cijin–Gushan ===
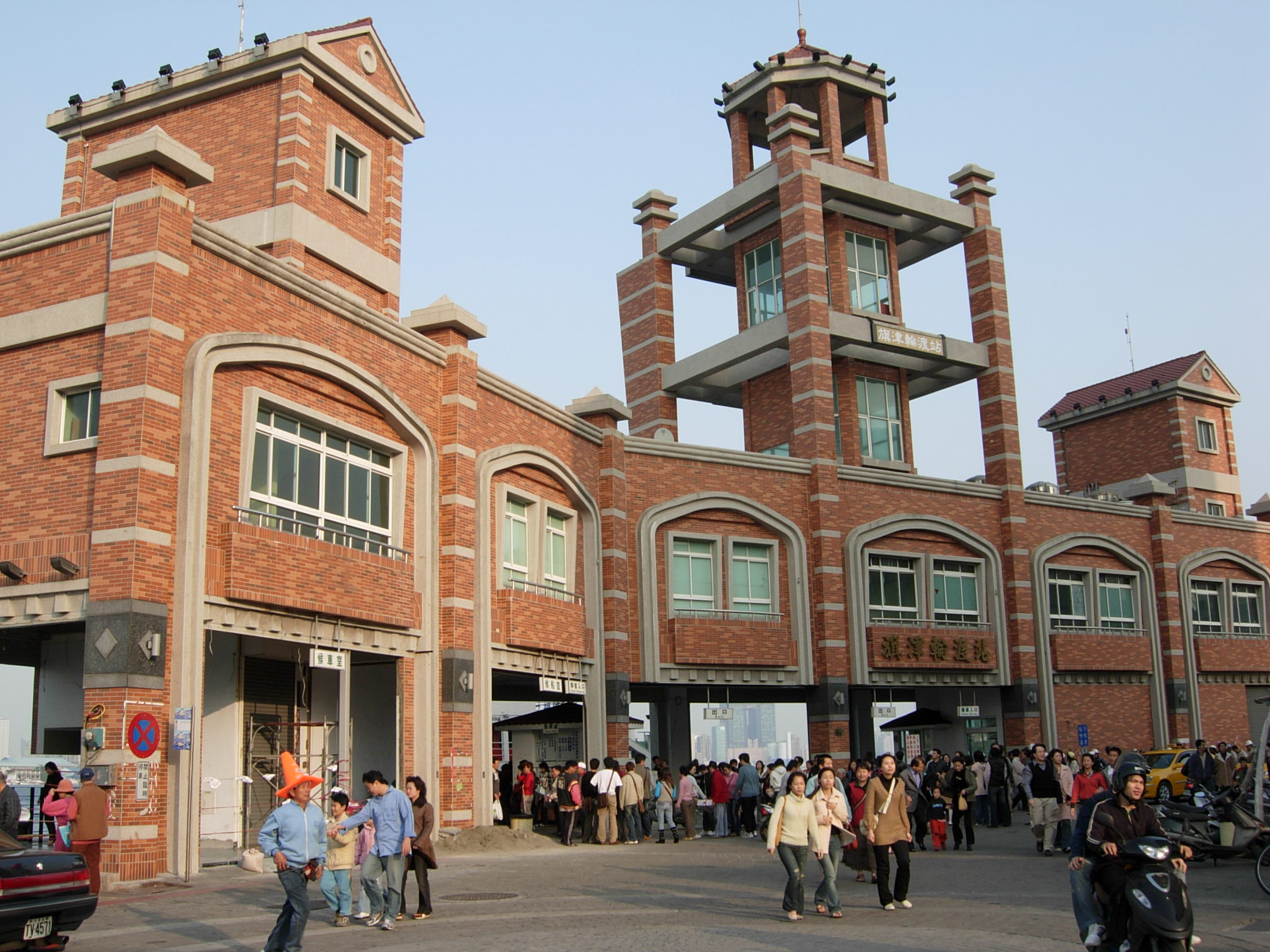
Cijin Ferry Pier

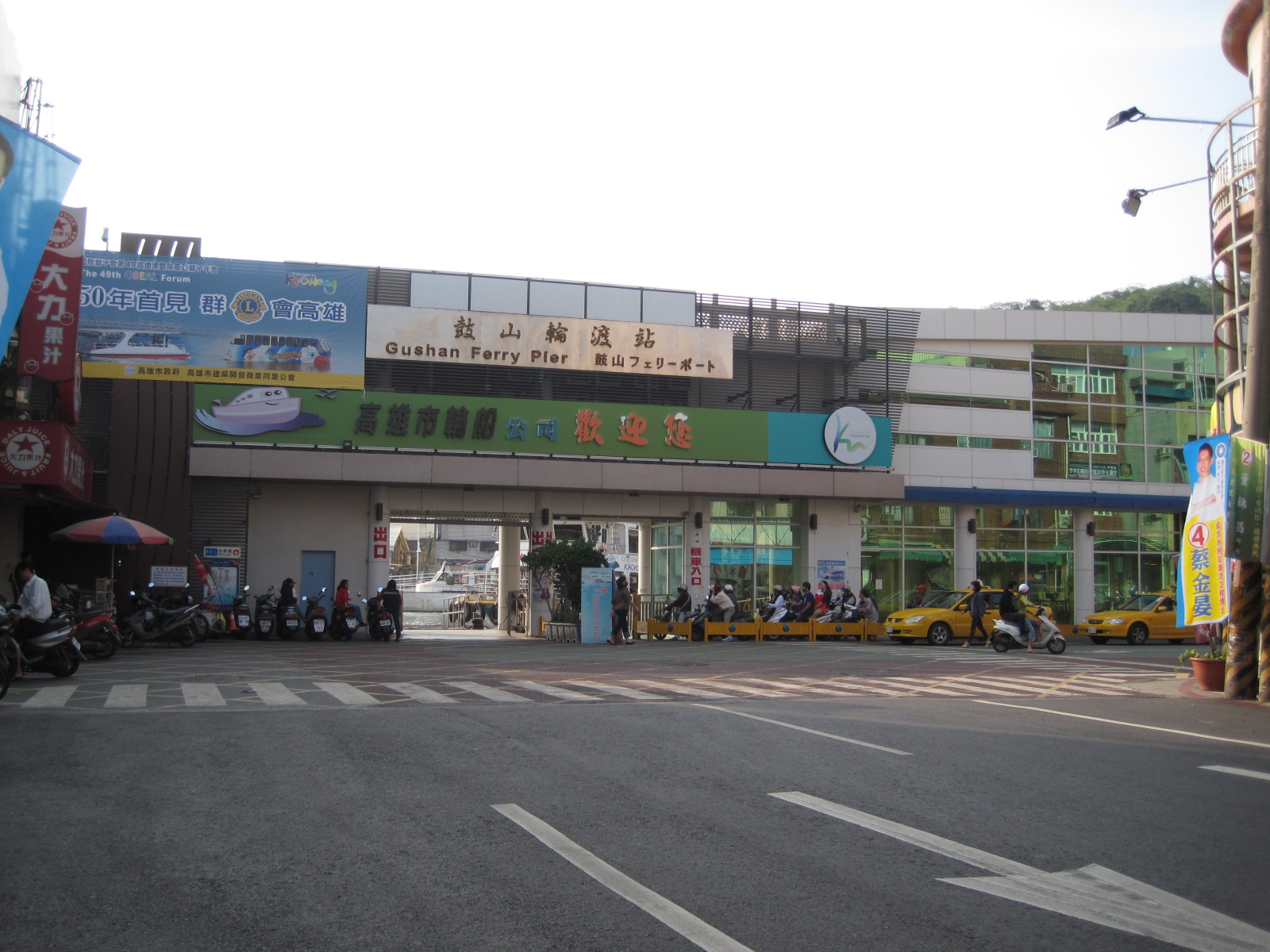
Gushan Ferry Pier

Cijin–Gushan Ferry
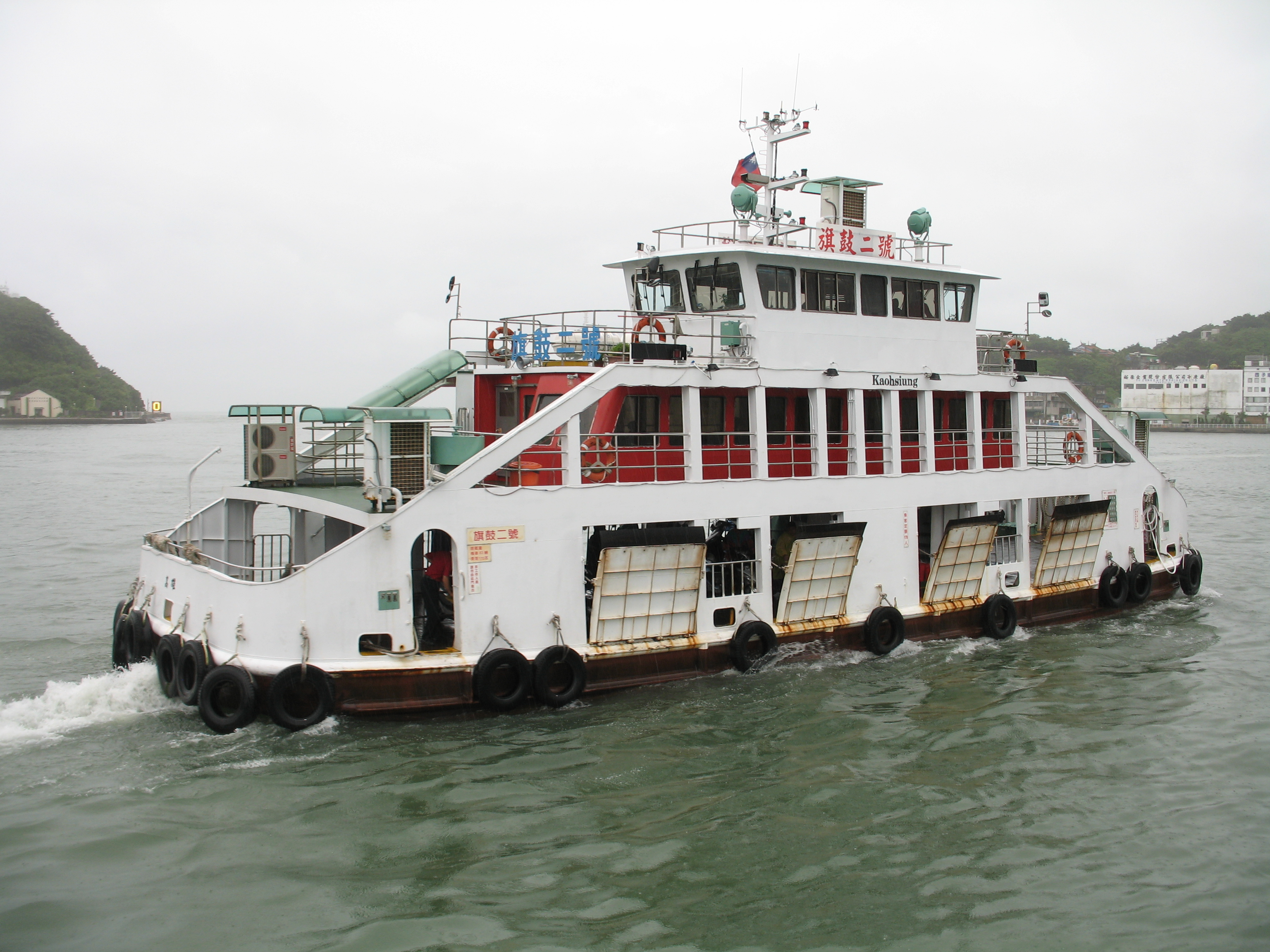
- Locale: Kaohsiung, Taiwan
- Transit type: Ferry
- No. of lines: 1
- No. of terminals: 2

Cijin–Gushan ferry connects the Cijin and Gushan Districts of Kaohsiung, Taiwan. It is popular with tourists visiting the attractions of Cijin Island.

A ride on the ferry cost around NT$0.2 in the 1970s, but the route has been operating since the Ming Dynasty. It currently costs NT$30 per one-way ride if paying cash, or NT$20 if paying by IPASS or EasyCard.

The journey takes about five minutes from Gushan to Cijin, an island which has seafood restaurants, traditional markets and a beach for tourists.

=== Cianjhen–Zhogzhou ===
Cianjhen–Zhogzhou Ferry
- Locale: Kaohsiung, Taiwan
- Transit type: Ferry
- No. of lines: 1
- No. of terminals: 2

Cianjhen–Zhogzhou ferry connects the Cianjhen and Zhogzhou, Cijin District of Kaohsiung, Taiwan.
