= Shoushan Zoo =

Zoo in Gushan, Kaohsiung, Taiwan

Shoushan Zoo 壽山動物園

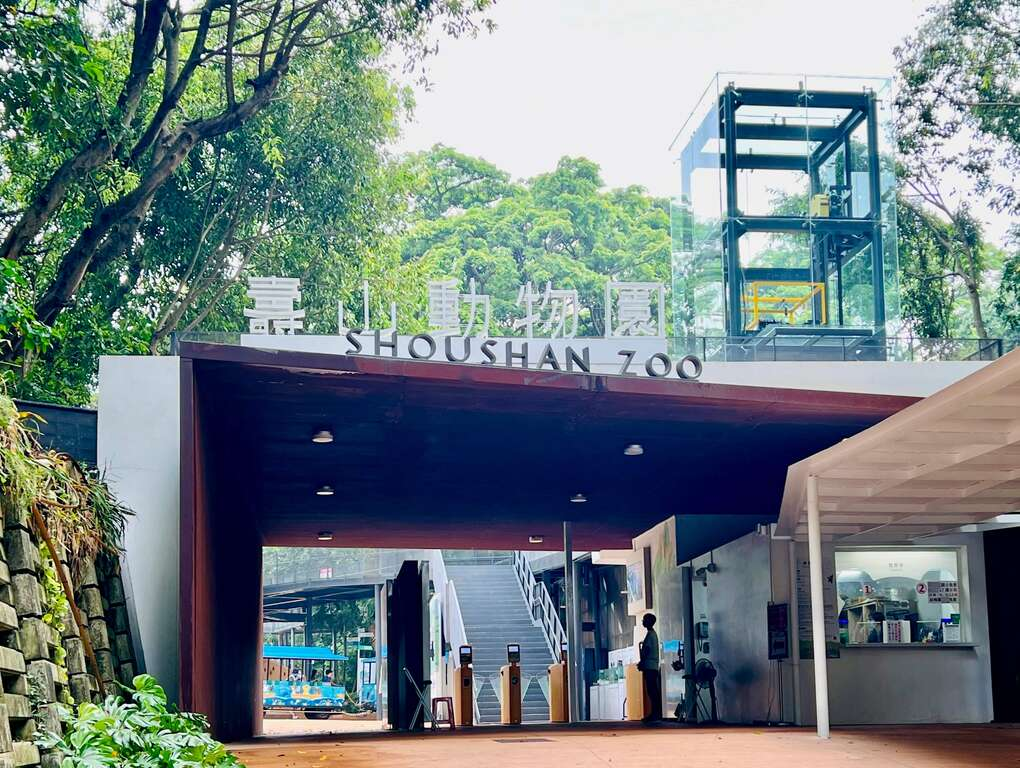
- New entrance for Shoushan Zoo
- Interactive map of Shoushan Zoo 壽山動物園
- 22.63461°N 120.27495°E
- Date opened: 1978 (original location); 1986 (current location)
- Location: Gushan, Kaohsiung, Taiwan
- Owner: Scenic Area Administration of Kaohsiung City Government
- Website: zoo.kcg.gov.tw

The Shoushan Zoo (Chinese: 壽山動物園; pinyin: Shòushān Dòngwùyuán) is a zoo in Gushan District, Kaohsiung, Taiwan. It is located on the northern border of Shoushan Park and houses animals from Asia, Africa, Americas and Australia, such as lions, tigers, elephants, black bears and kangaroos.

== History ==
It was founded in 1978 but moved to its present location in 1986. The zoo belongs to the Scenic Area Administration of Kaohsiung City now.

A number of incidents in 2007 brought to light varying issues the zoo had accumulated over the years. From reports of zoo staff not knowing the species and sex of its animals to veterinarians losing limbs to a crocodile, further investigation drew forth acknowledgement of the zoo's lack of funding and manpower. Visiting experts and directors have described it as the worst government-run zoo in Taiwan in consideration of terrible conditions their animals are kept in. Since then however, the zoo has undergone a considerable renovation project in 2009 costing NT$150 million. Whether or not this was related to the then unconfirmed plan to import two white tigers is debatable, but the zoo reopened on July 12 in the same year after 5 months of reconstruction and as of 26 May 2011 does indeed now have the aforementioned animals.

== Exhibitions ==
The zoo consists of the following exhibitions:

=== Animal Trail ===
This area includes enclosures for hippopotamuses, red-legged pademelons, Linnaeus's two-toed sloths, green iguanas, Burmese pythons, Chinese ferret-badgers, Formosan masked palm civets and meerkats.

=== Apes ===
This area showcases primates, including orangutans, lar gibbons, yellow-cheeked gibbons, hamadryas baboons, Celebes crested macaques, northern pig-tailed macaques and crab-eating macaques.

=== Aquatic Animals ===
This area includes alligator snapping turtles, spectacled caimans and pygmy hippopotamuses.

=== Bird Enclosure ===
This immersive bird enclosure includes Palawan peacock-pheasants, trumpeter hornbills, western crowned pigeons and long-tailed chinchillas.

=== Chimpanzees ===
An open-air enclosure with chimpanzees.

=== Cross-habitat Animal Ecotope ===
The Tiger Hill enclosure is located in this area. This enclosure houses Bengal tigers and white tigers.

Other animals this area includes are dromedary camels, American bison, saltwater crocodiles and miniature horses.

=== Deer ===
The Deer Park, known as the Little Nara of Shoushan, is created with a high-level coral reef forest environment where visitors can watch sika deer up close.

=== Formosan Animal Area ===
This area is designed to simulate the native ecosystem with animals native to Taiwan. Formosan black bears are showcased in the Hut of Black Bear. Other animals housed in this area include Reeves's muntjac, Taiwan serows and South American coatis.

=== Friendly Animal Area ===
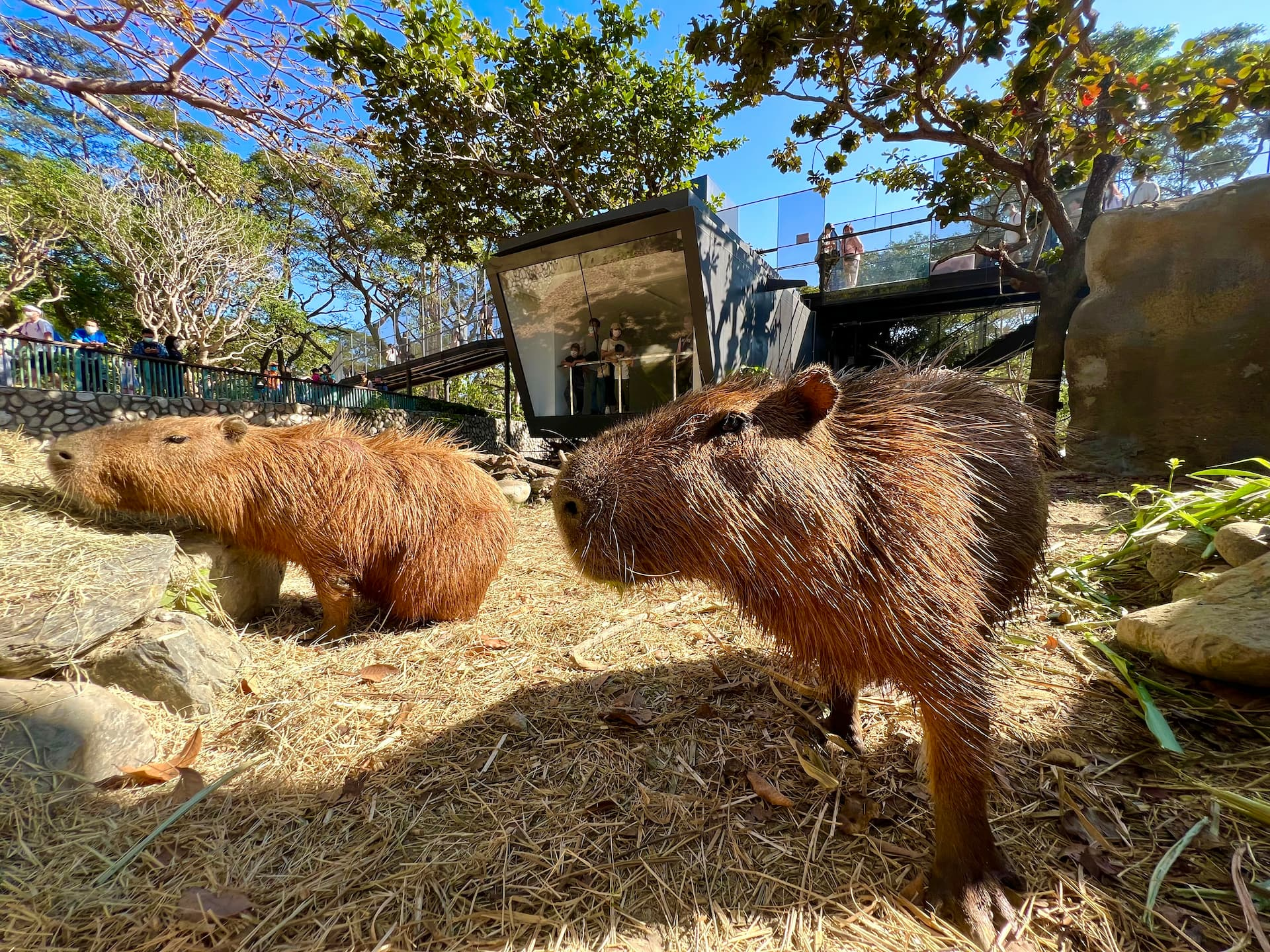
The Hut of Capybara

The Hut of Capybara is located in this area, which it includes many capybaras.

Other animals in this area includes alpacas, Taiwan yellow cattle, miniature horses, Sardinian donkeys, Barbados Black Belly sheep, European fallow deer and Malayan sun bears.

=== Kid’s Farm ===
An interactive, kid-friendly area for children and families to view animals in close proximity. Visitors can feed and pet the boer goats. Other animals in this area include common pheasants, great hornbills and Stump-tailed macaques.

=== Savanna Animal Area ===
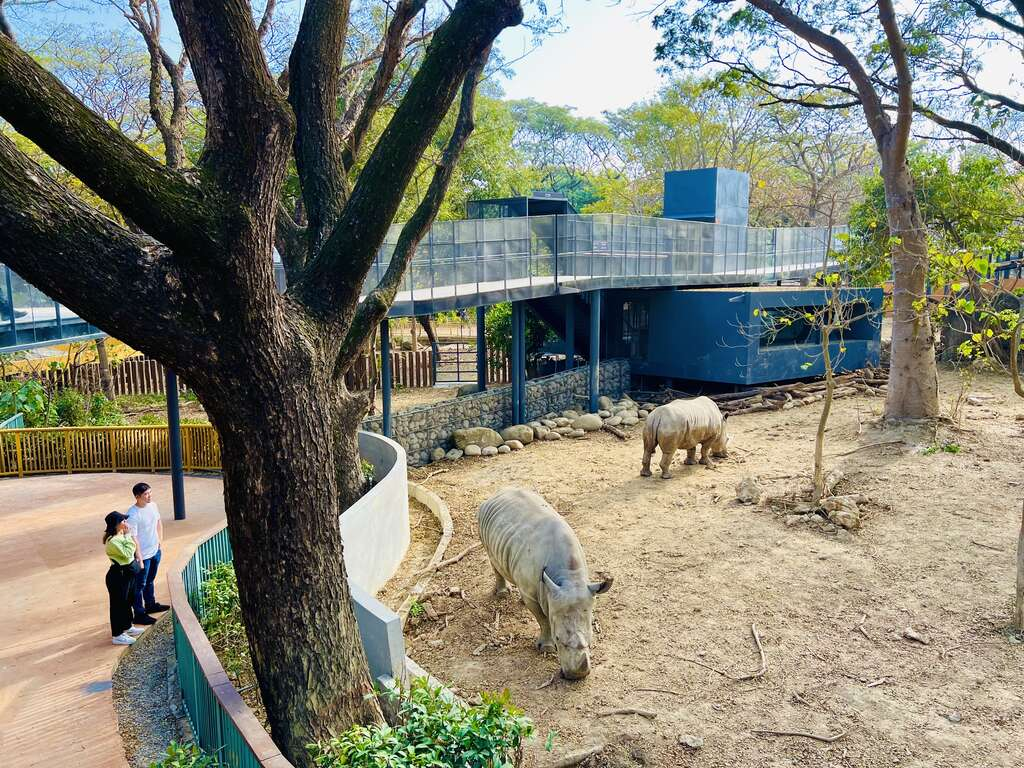
Enclosure of White rhinoceros

This area includes African Lions, African elephants, Common elands, White rhinoceroses, wildebeests, Chapman's zebras, alpacas, addax, grey crowned cranes, Falabella horses, emus, Aldabra giant tortoises, African spurred tortoises and crested porcupines.

== Transportation ==
The zoo is accessible by taking the City Bus No. 56 to Shoushan Zoo bus stop.

The bus is accessible from the following railway stations:

- Kaohsiung Railway Station
- MRT Yanchengpu Station - Exit from Exit 4. Turn right on Wufu 4th Road for about 10 meters and take bus No. 56 in front of Hua Nan Bank to Shoushan Zoo.
- LRT Wenwu Temple Station -Get off the LRT at Wenwu Temple Station. Follow Dagong Road and turn right on Gushan 1st Road for about 50 meters to take bus 56 at Taipower Station to Shoushan Zoo.

Alternatively, visitors can get the Bus 219 service to Gushan Administration Center, then walk along Wanshou Road, passing by Yuanheng Temple, Wanshou Mountain Bridge and the zoo parking area to arrive at the main entrance.

== Gallery ==
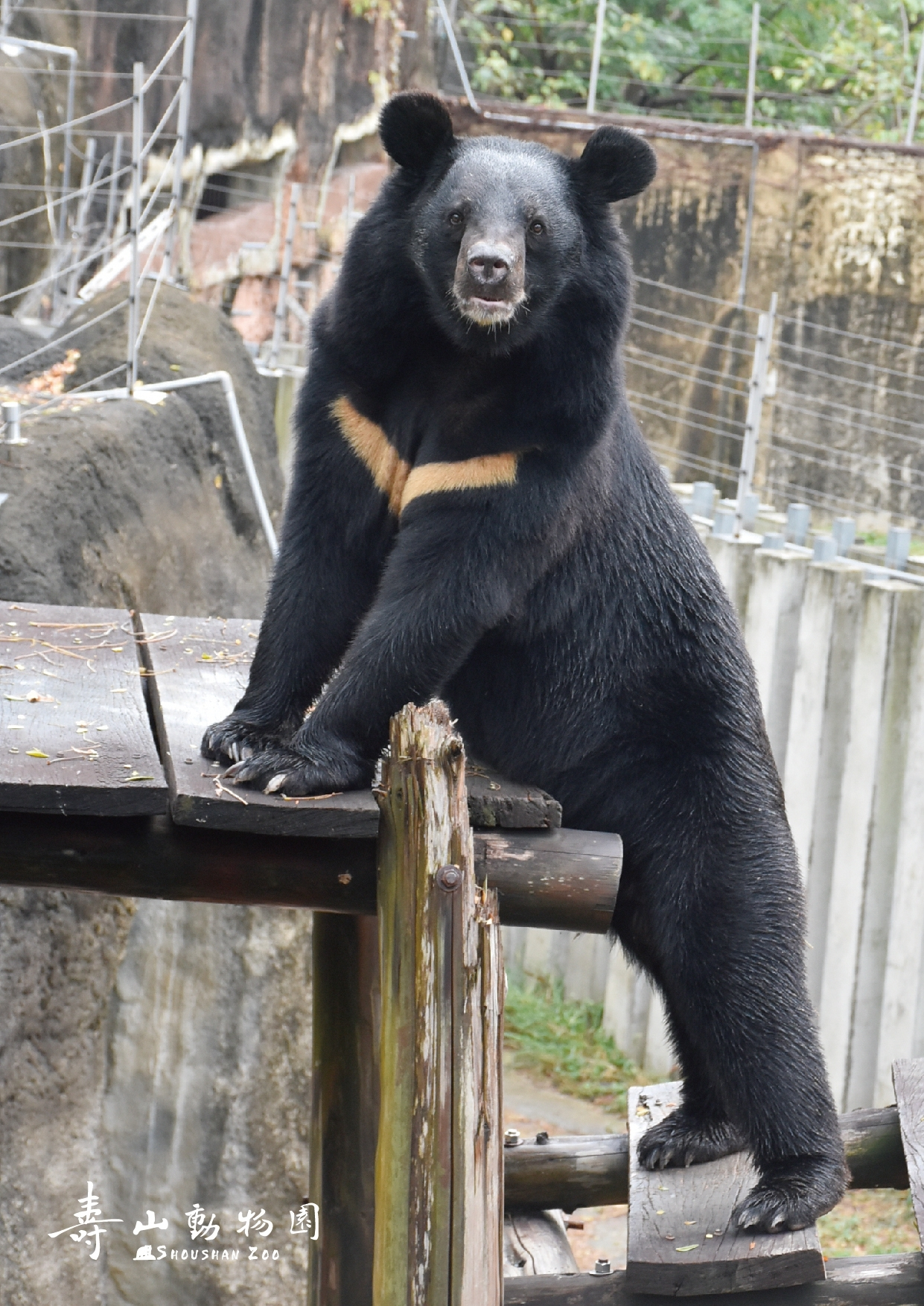
Formosan black bear

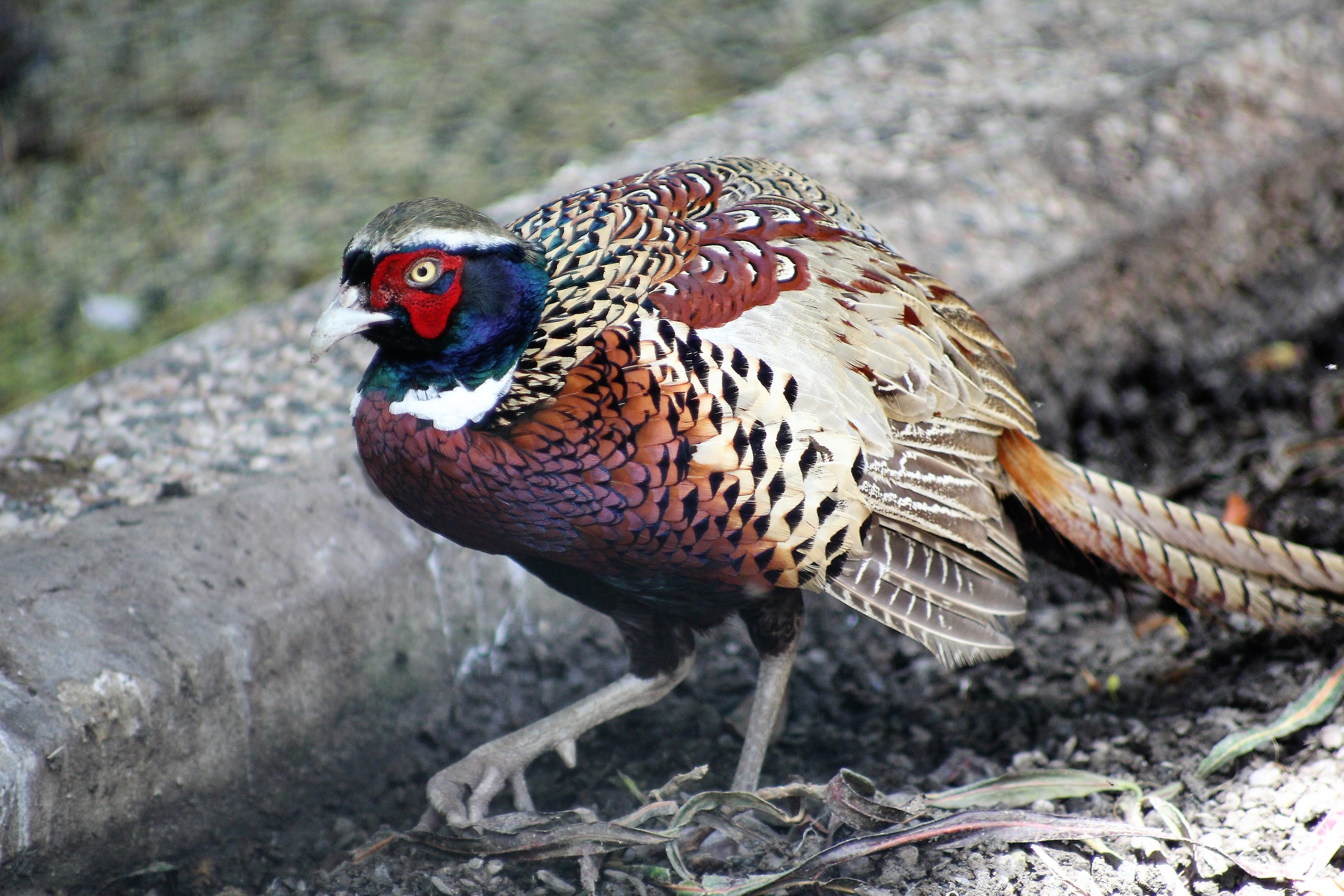
Formosan ring-necked phesant

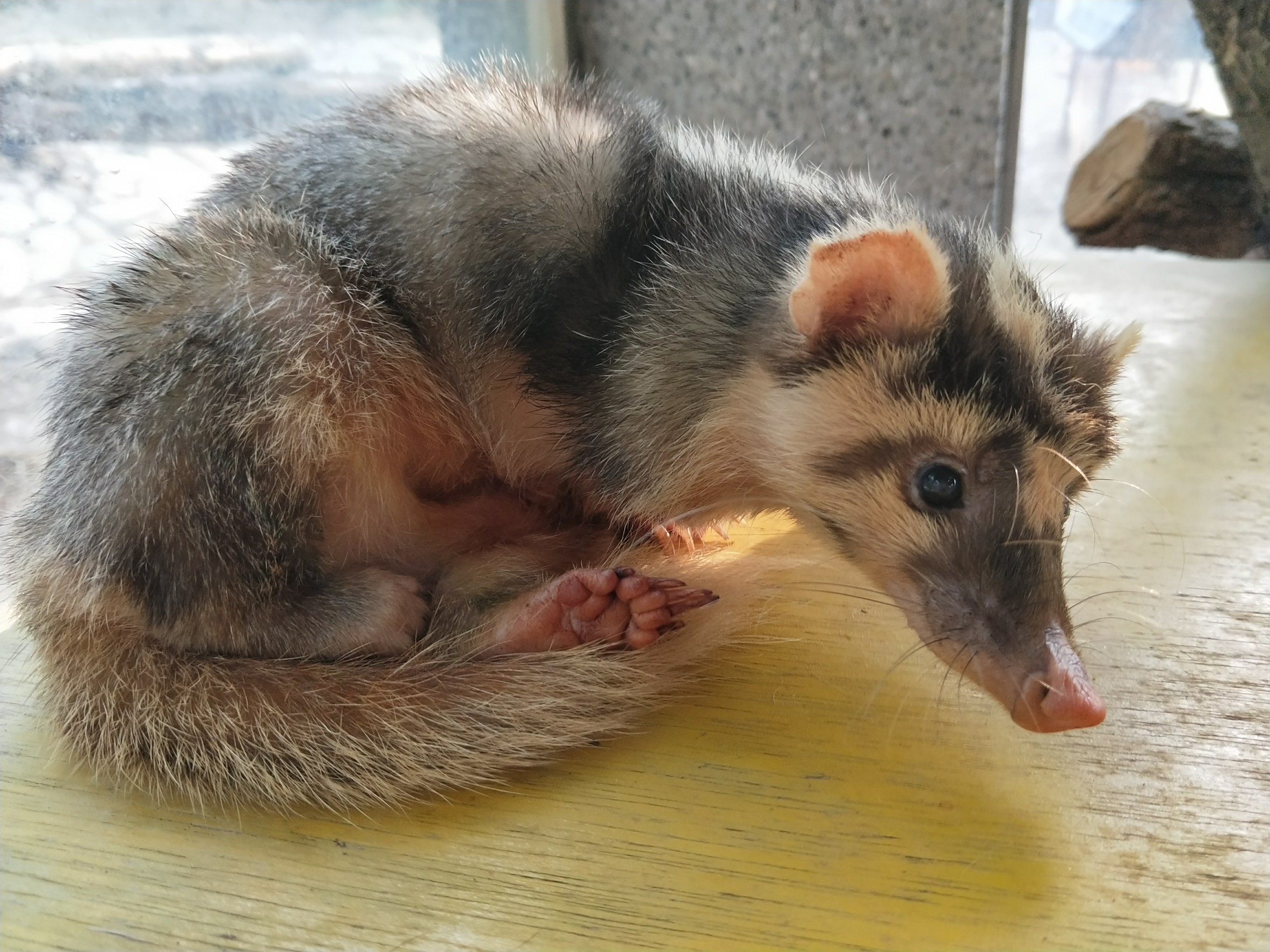
Formosan ferret-badger

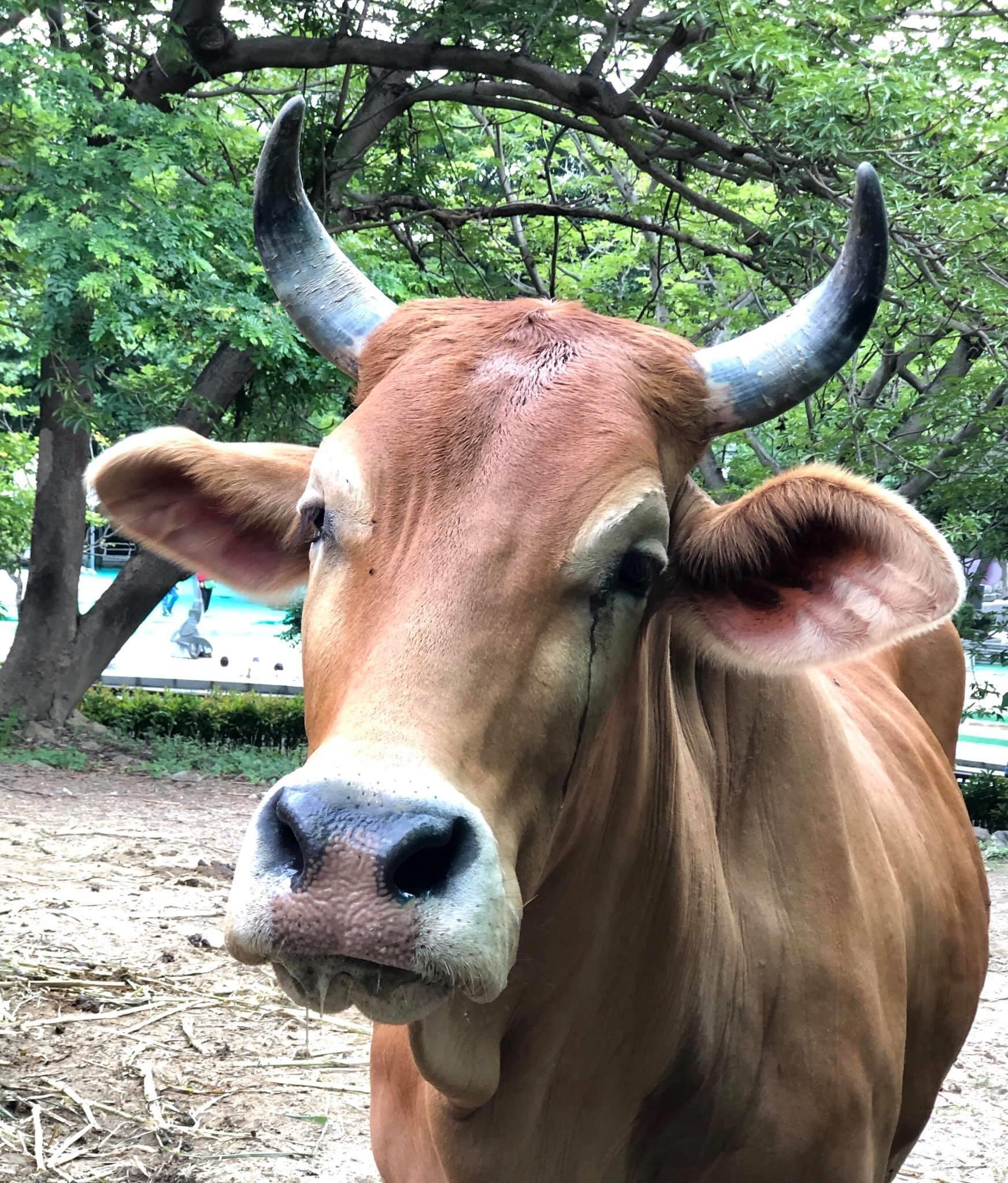
Taiwan yellow cattle

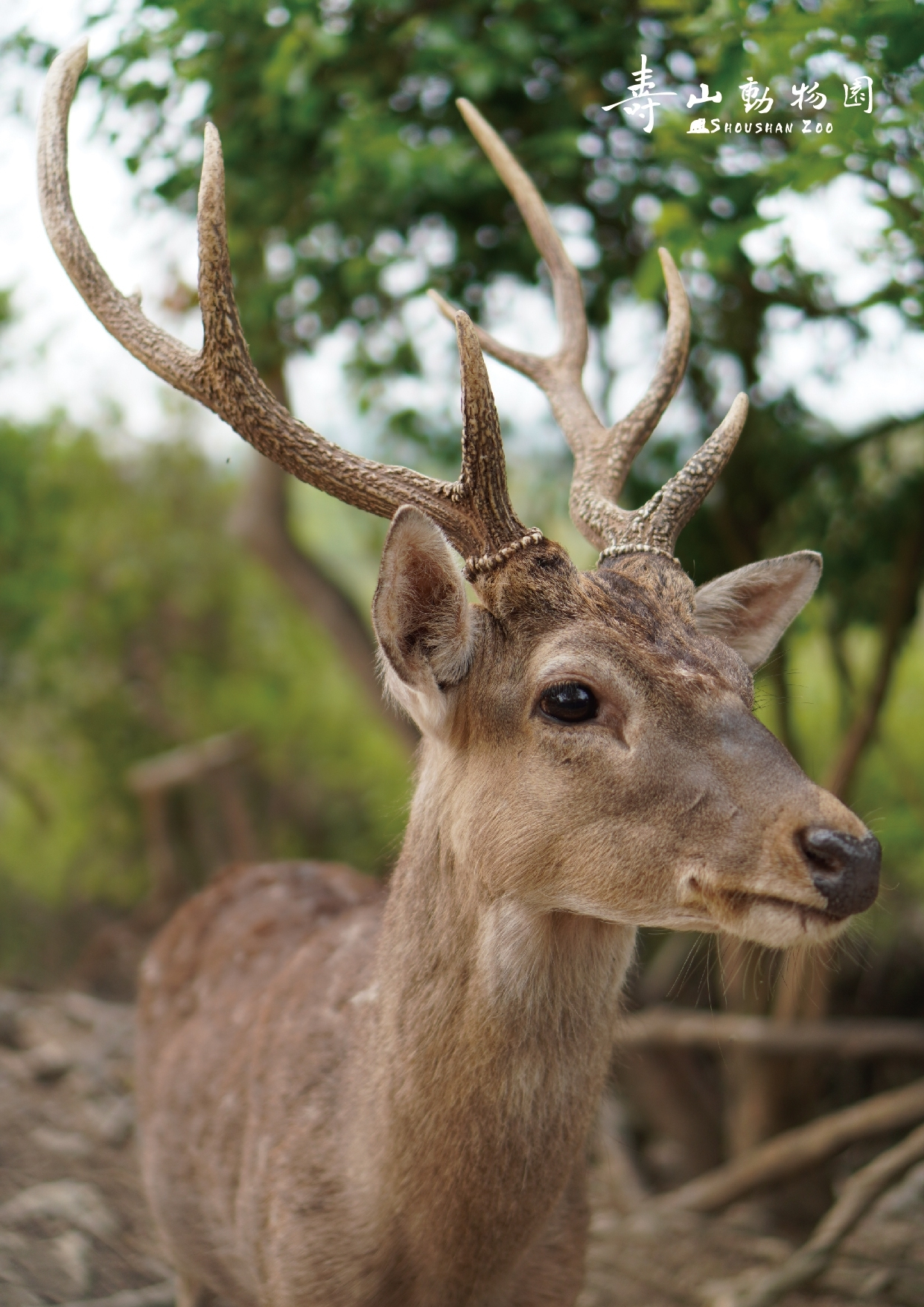
Formosan sika deer

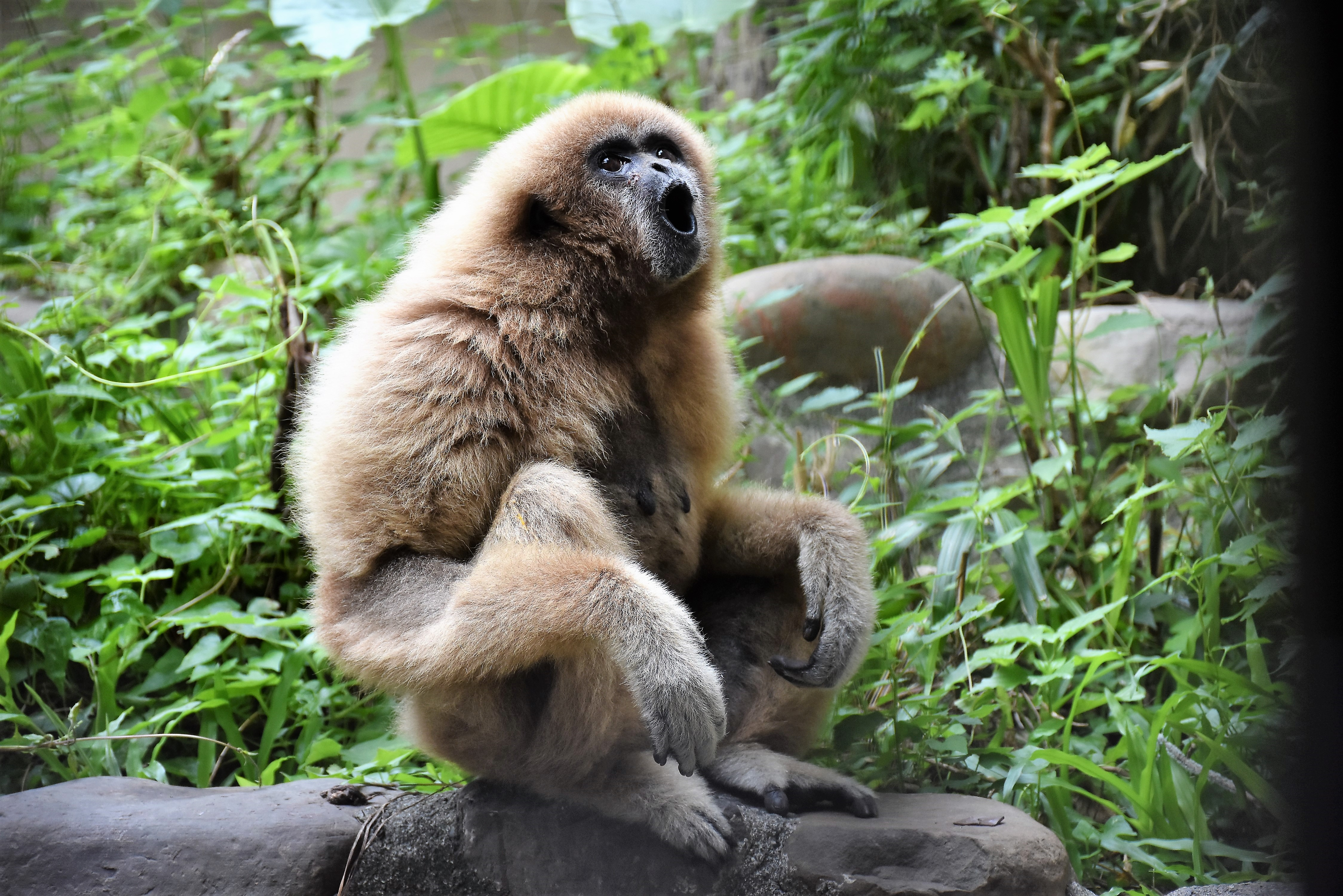
White-handed gibbon

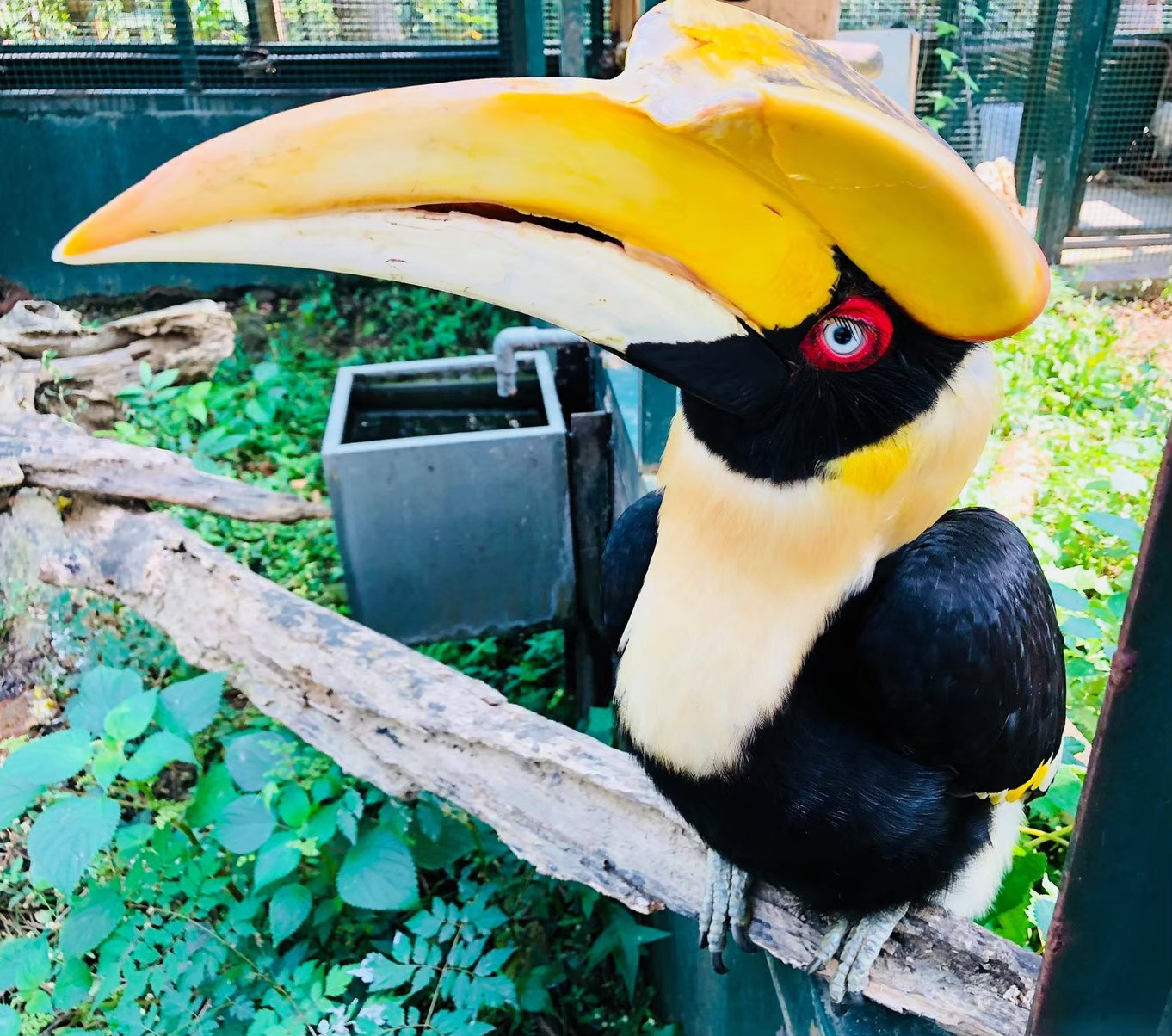
Great hornbill

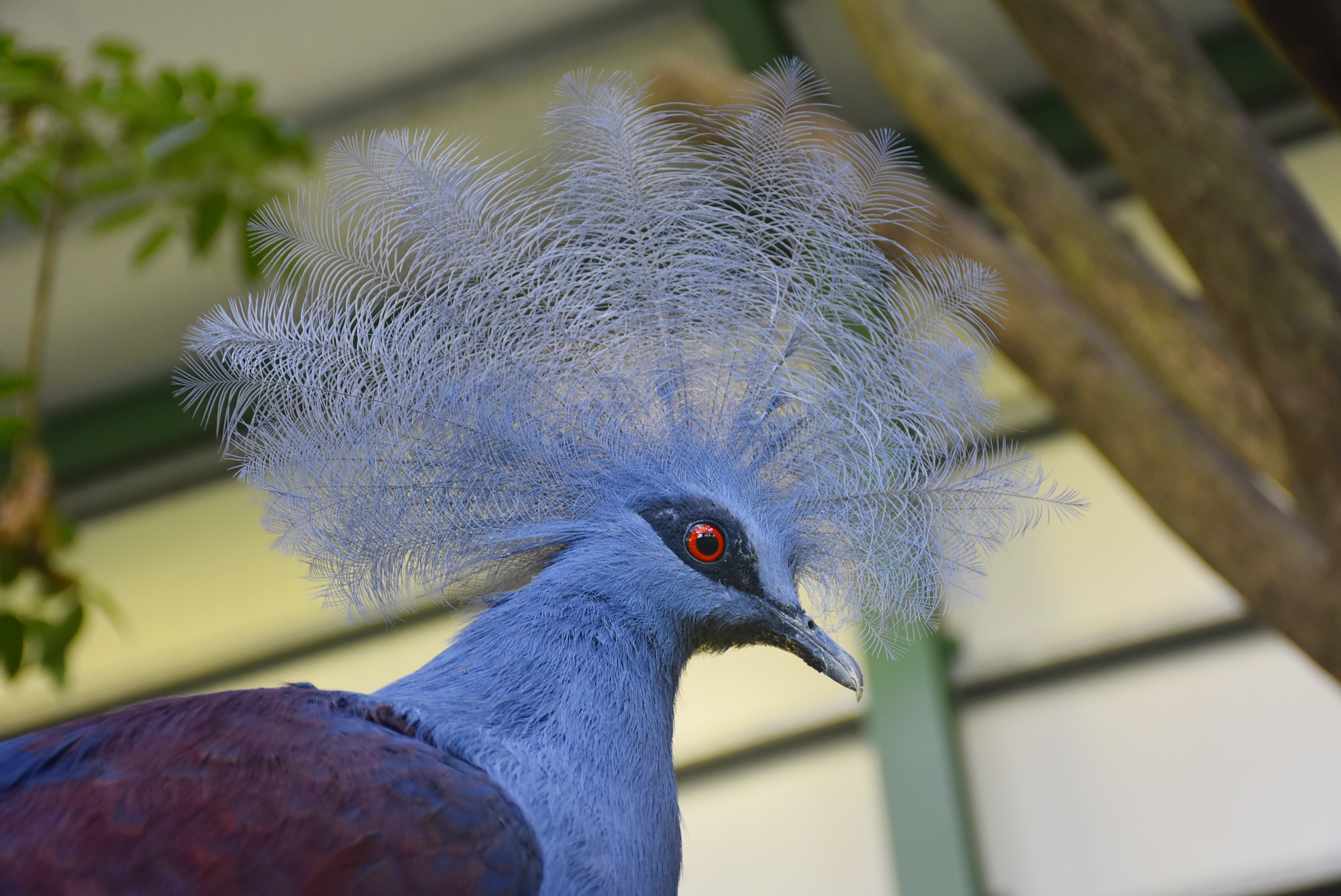
Western crowned pigeon

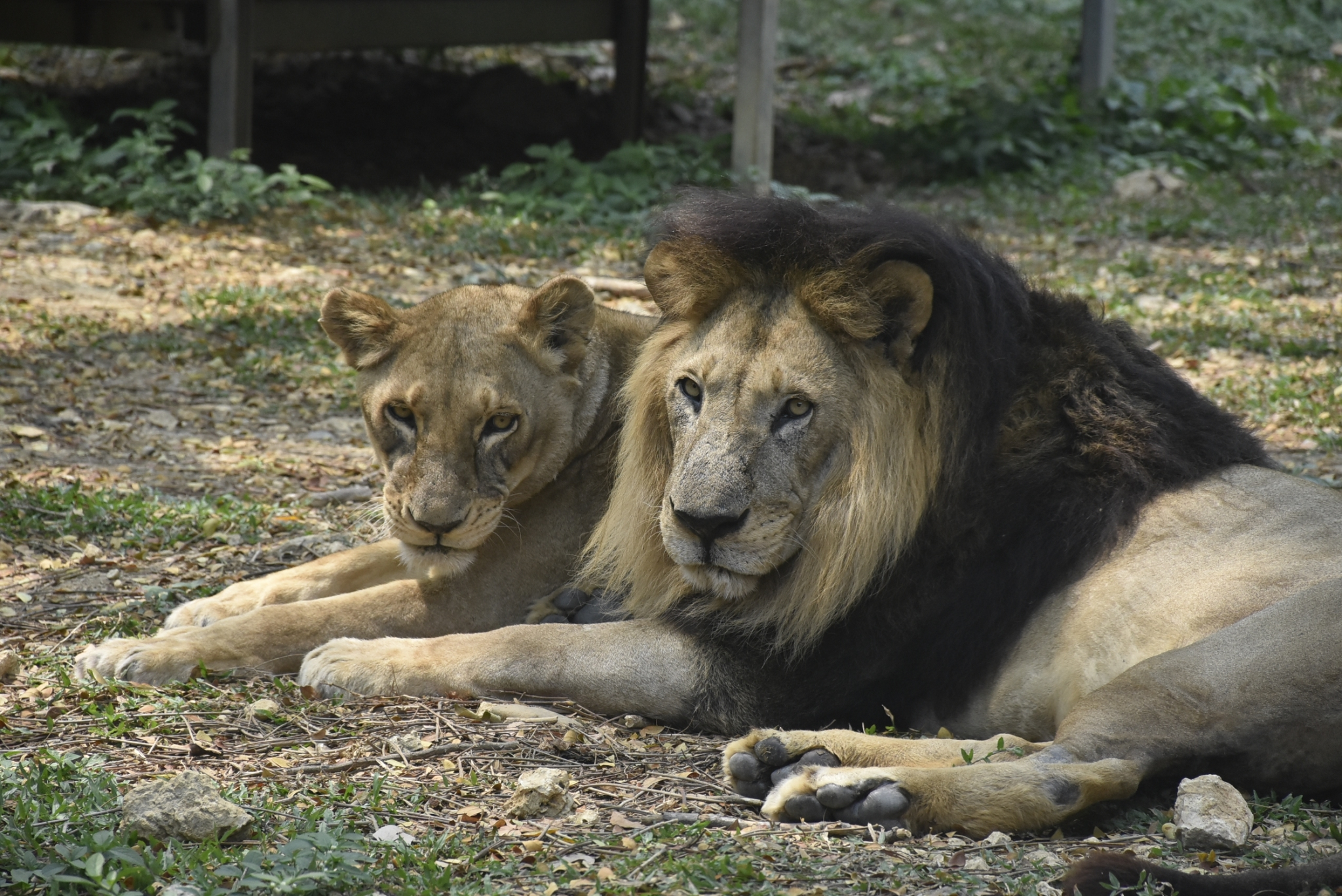
African lions

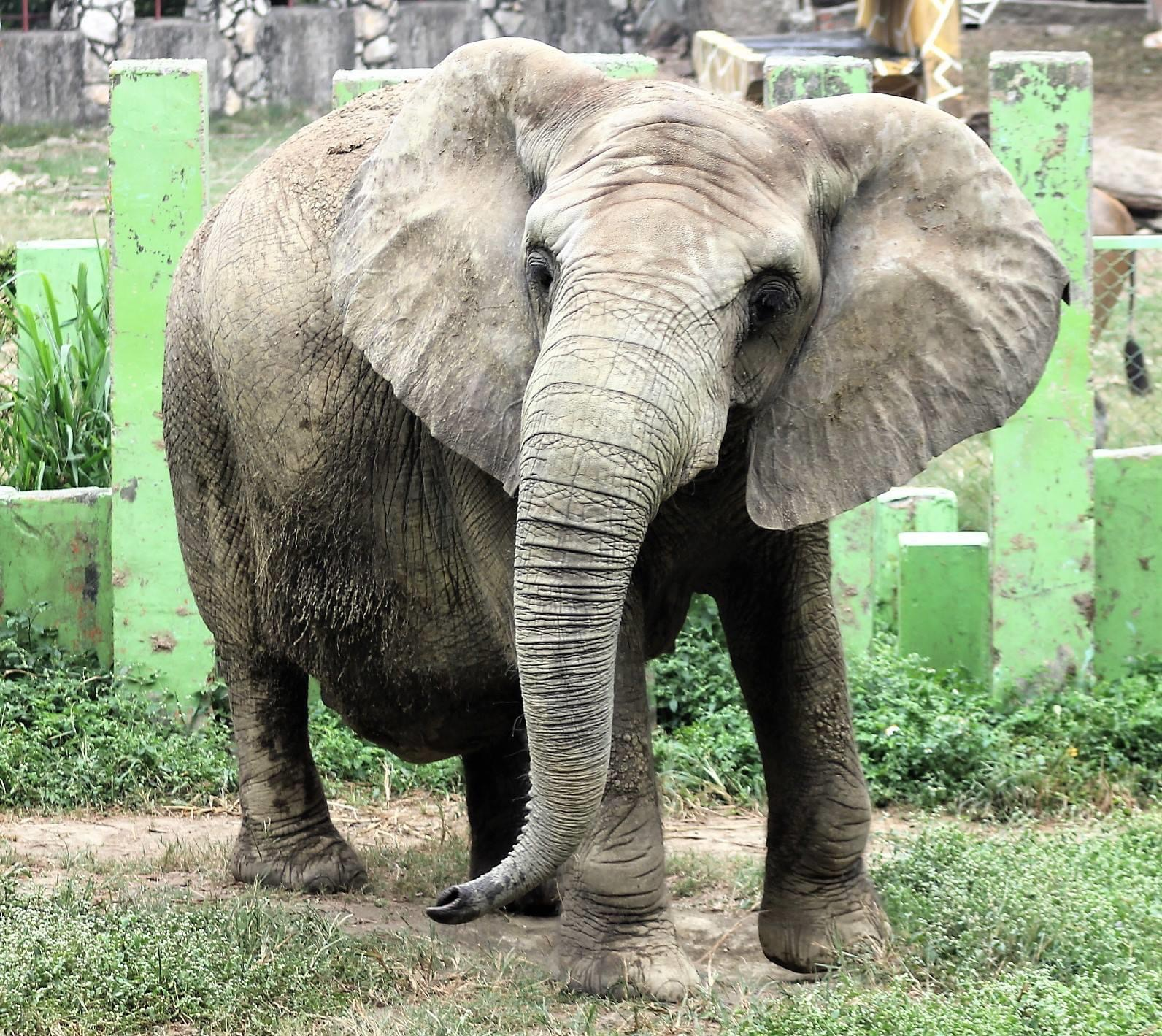
African elephant

== See also ==
- List of tourist attractions in Taiwan
