= State-owned Enterprises Commission =

Government agency of Taiwan

- 經濟部國營事業委員會
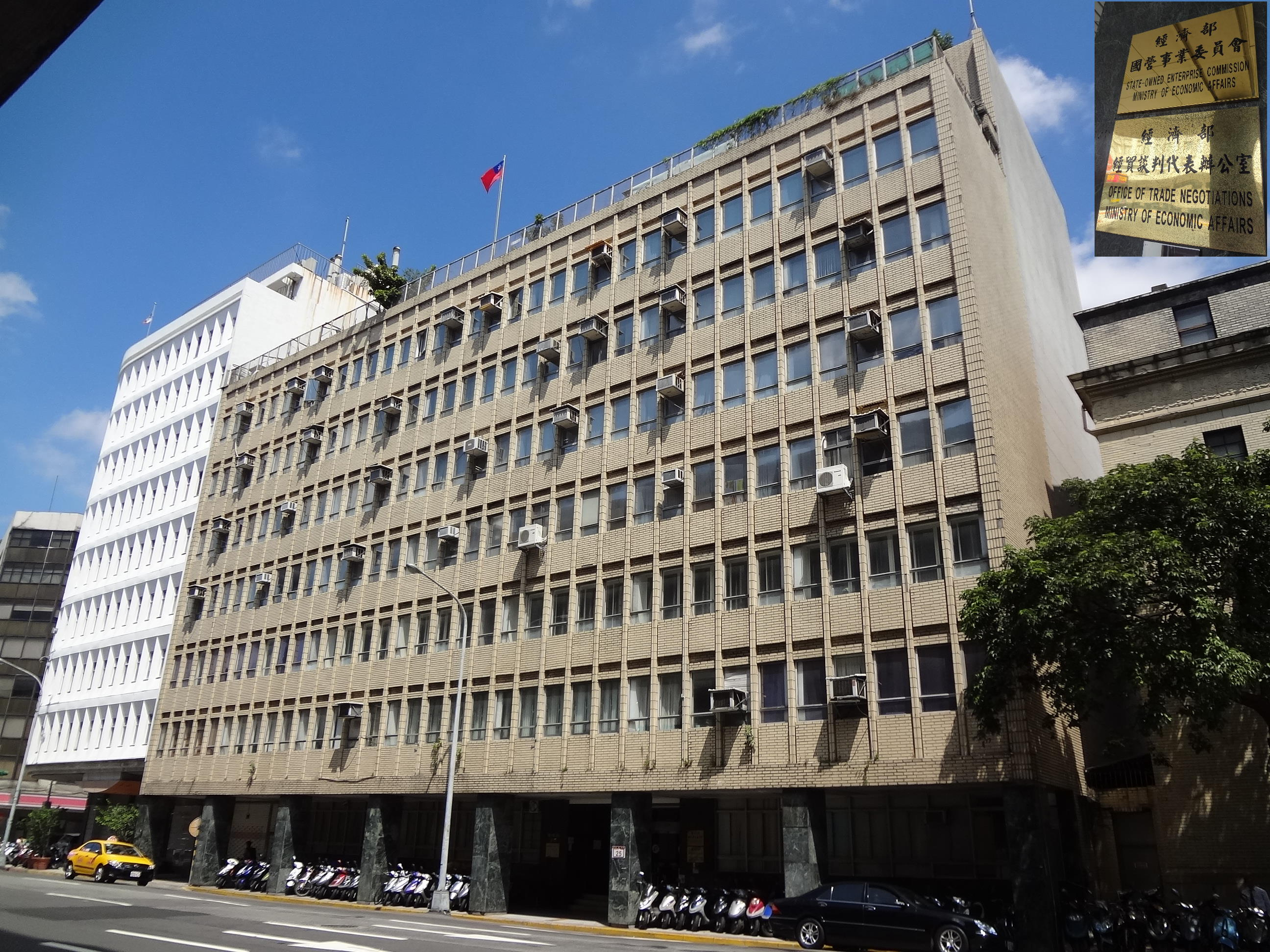

Agency overview
- Formed: 1952 (as National Corporations Department); 2003 (as SEC)
- Jurisdiction: Taiwan (ROC)
- Headquarters: Zhongzheng, Taipei; 25°02′29.4″N 121°30′39.1″E
- Parent agency: Ministry of Economic Affairs
- Website: Official website

The State-owned Enterprises Commission (SEC; traditional Chinese: 經濟部國營事業委員會; simplified Chinese: 经济部国营事业委员会; pinyin: Jīngjì Bù Guóyíng Shìyè Wěiyuánhuì) is the government agency of the Ministry of Economic Affairs of the Taiwan (ROC) in charge of supervising the management and operation of state-owned enterprises.

== History ==
SEC was originally established as National Corporations Department in 1952. In 1965, it was restructured to the Commission for the Commercialization of National Corporations. In 1969, it was reorganized to become the Commission of National Corporations. In 2003, it was renamed the State-owned Enterprise Commission.

== Organizational structures ==
- First Division
- Second Division
- Third Division
- Fourth Division
- Personnel Office
- Accounting Office
- Government Ethics Office

== Transportation ==
The headquarter office is accessible within walking distance south of Ximen Station of Taipei Metro.

== See also ==
- Economy of Taiwan
- State-owned Assets Supervision and Administration Commission, the equivalent in Mainland China (PRC).
