= Former Sanhe Bank =

Bank in Gushan, Kaohsiung, Taiwan

- 舊三和銀行
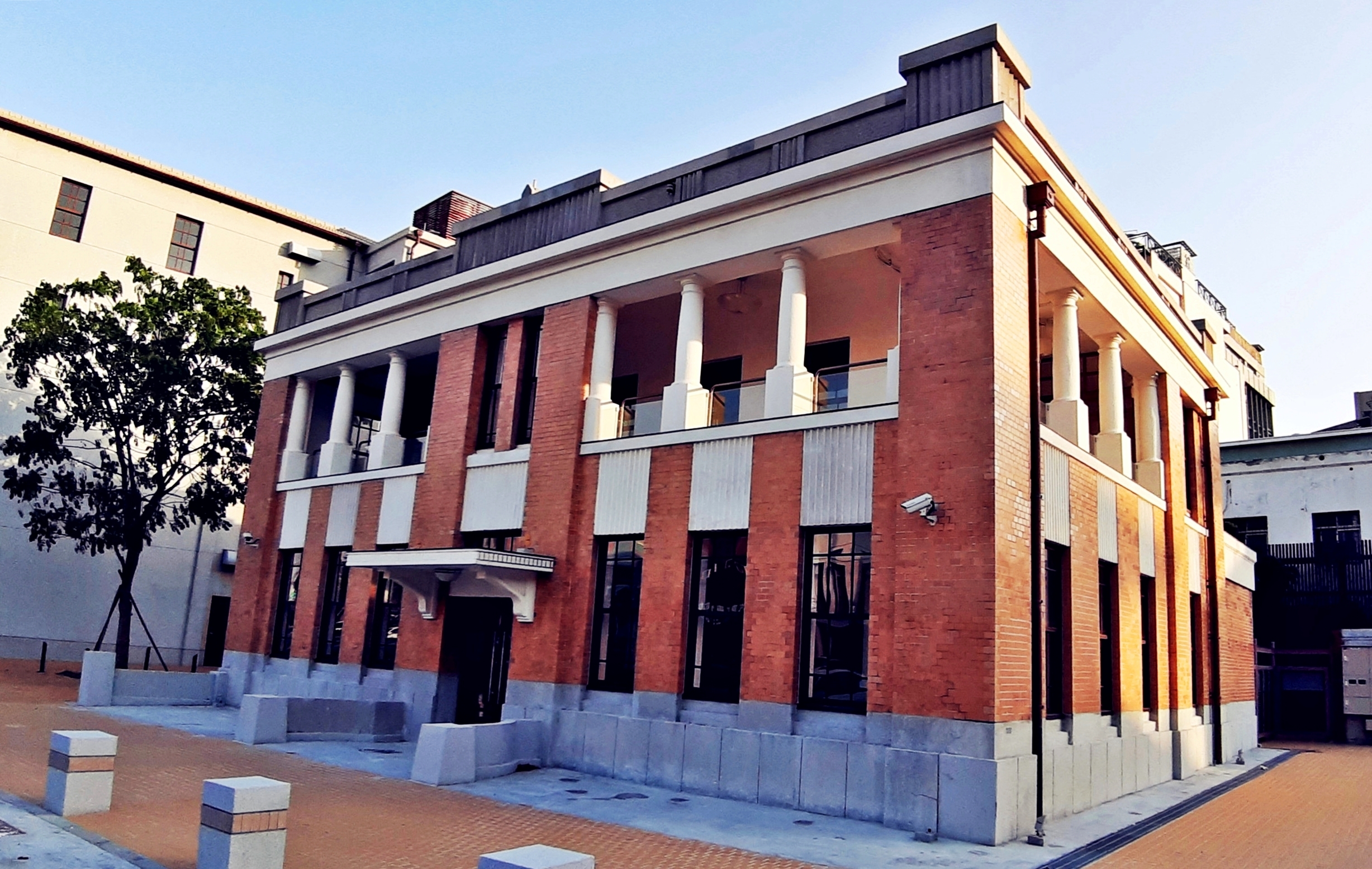
- Interactive map of the Former Sanhe Bank area

General information
- Type: former bank
- Location: Gushan, Kaohsiung, Taiwan
- Coordinates: 22°37′20.4″N 120°16′27.7″E
- Completed: 1921

The Former Sanhe Bank (traditional Chinese: 舊三和銀行; simplified Chinese: 旧三和银行; pinyin: Jiù Sānhé Yínháng) is a historical bank building in Gushan District, Kaohsiung, Taiwan.

== History ==
The bank building was the branch of Sanjushi-Ginko Bank set up in 1921. In 1933, the bank was changed to Sanwa Bank after series of merging negotiation. After the handover of Taiwan from Japan to the Republic of China in 1945, the Kaohsiung branch of Sanwa Bank was merged with other branches into the Bank of Taiwan. The bank building was then turned into the property of Sinbin Police Station under the Kaohsiung City Police Department. In 1990, the police station was moved to its current location due to space congestion. The building has then been idle.

== Architecture ==
The bank uses reinforced concrete beam-column structure. Its exterior walls are covered with khaki face bricks and stucco washing finish. Its ceiling is mud-plastered with bamboo inside.

== Transportation ==
The building is accessible within walking distance north of Hamasen Station of Kaohsiung MRT.

== See also ==
- List of tourist attractions in Taiwan
