= Sky Balcony (Kaohsiung) =

Observation deck in Kaohsiung, Taiwan

- 鐵道園區天空雲台
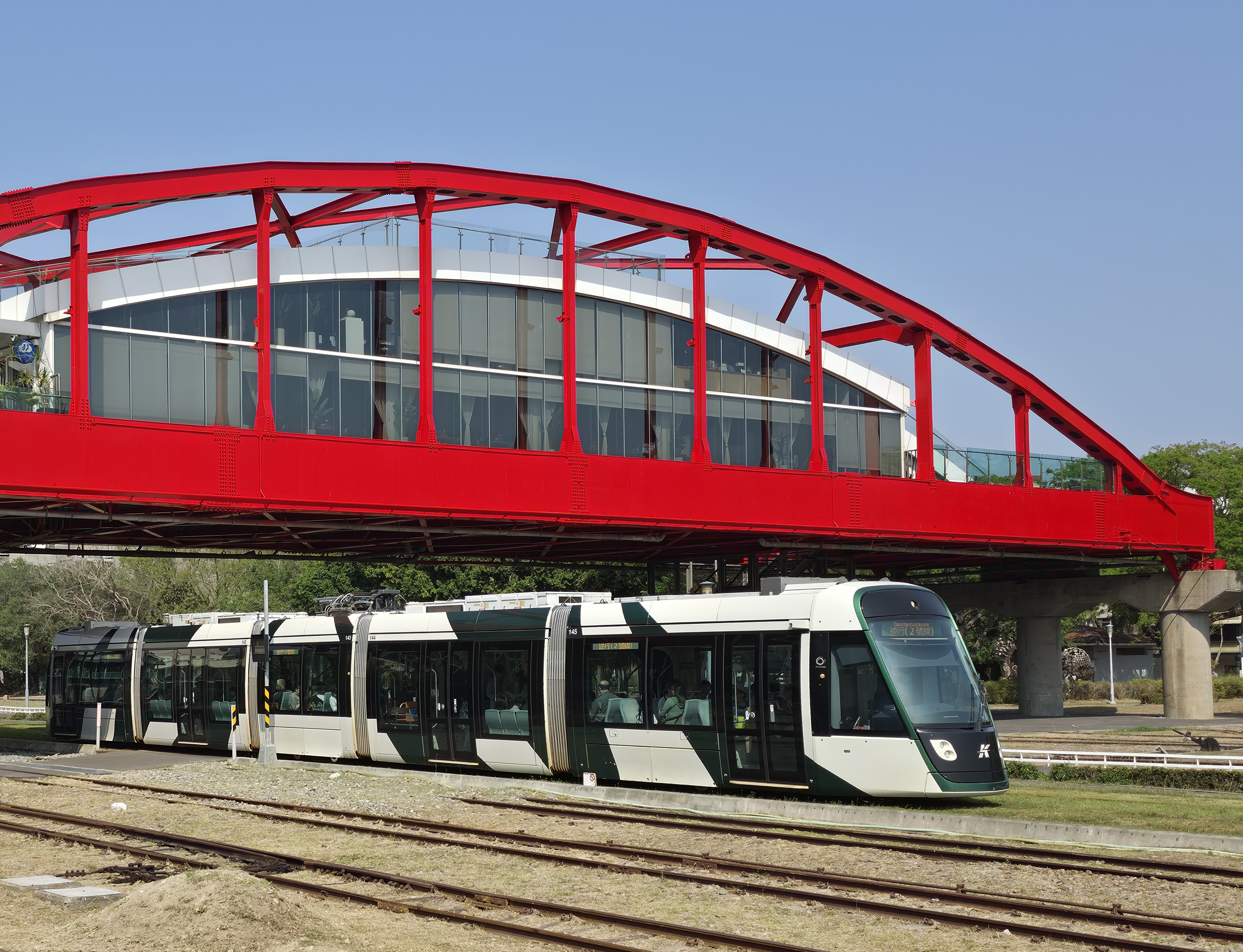
- Kaohsiung Light Rail tram passing beneath Sky Balcony
- Interactive map of the Sky Balcony area

General information
- Type: Observation deck
- Location: Gushan District, Kaohsiung, Taiwan
- Coordinates: 22.619191°N 120.266923°E

Sky Balcony (Chinese: 鐵道園區天空雲台; pinyin: Tiědào Yuánqū Tiānkōng Yúntái; lit. 'Railway Park Sky Platform') is an elevated observation deck and pedestrian bridge above the Hamasen Railway Cultural Park in Gushan District, Kaohsiung, Taiwan. It opened on 26 September 2014.

The deck is lighted up at night. The platform overlooking Gongyuan 2nd Road is designed to resemble a massive ship's bow.

== Gallery ==
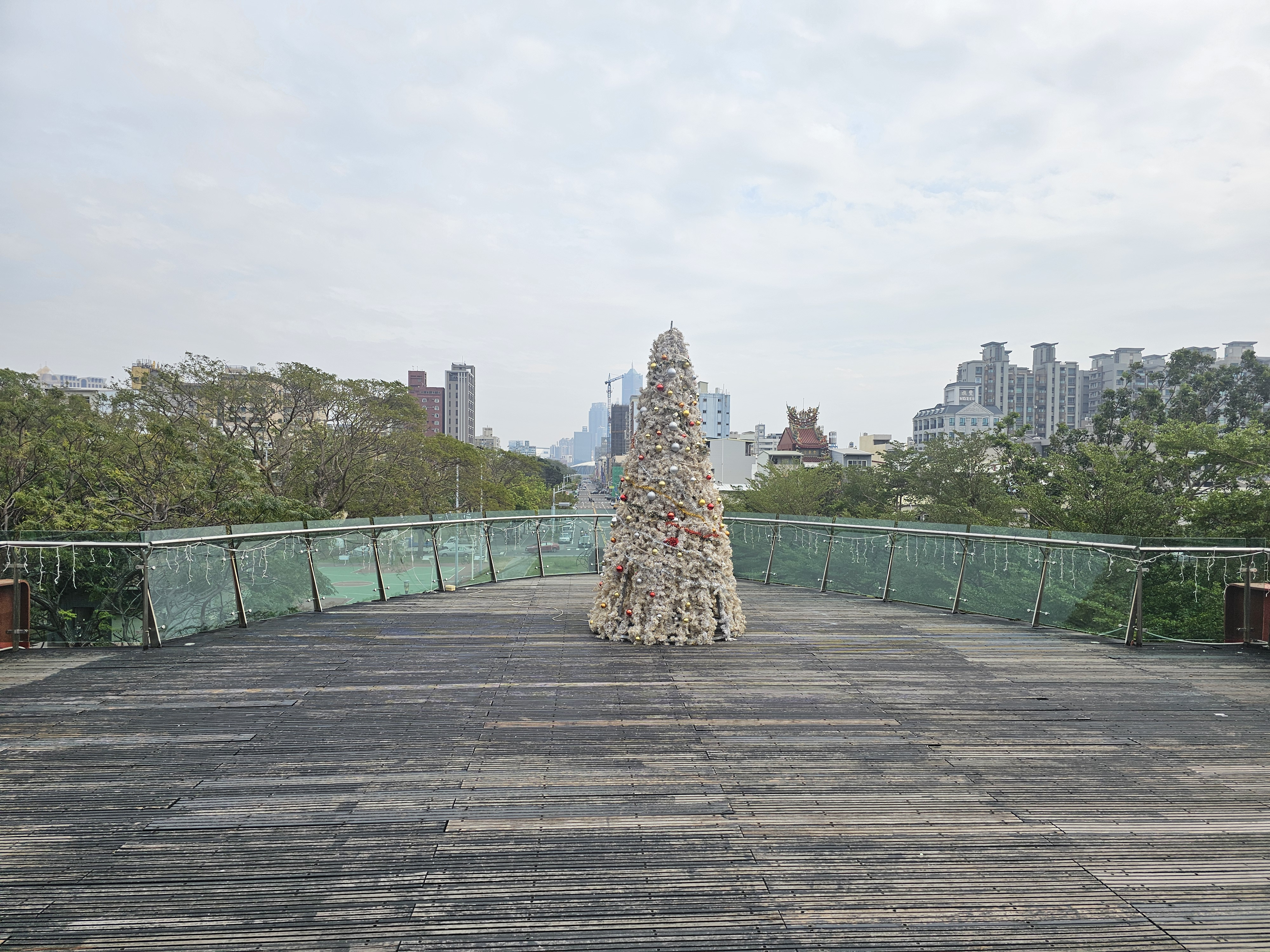
Christmas tree displayed on Sky Balcony in Kaohsiung

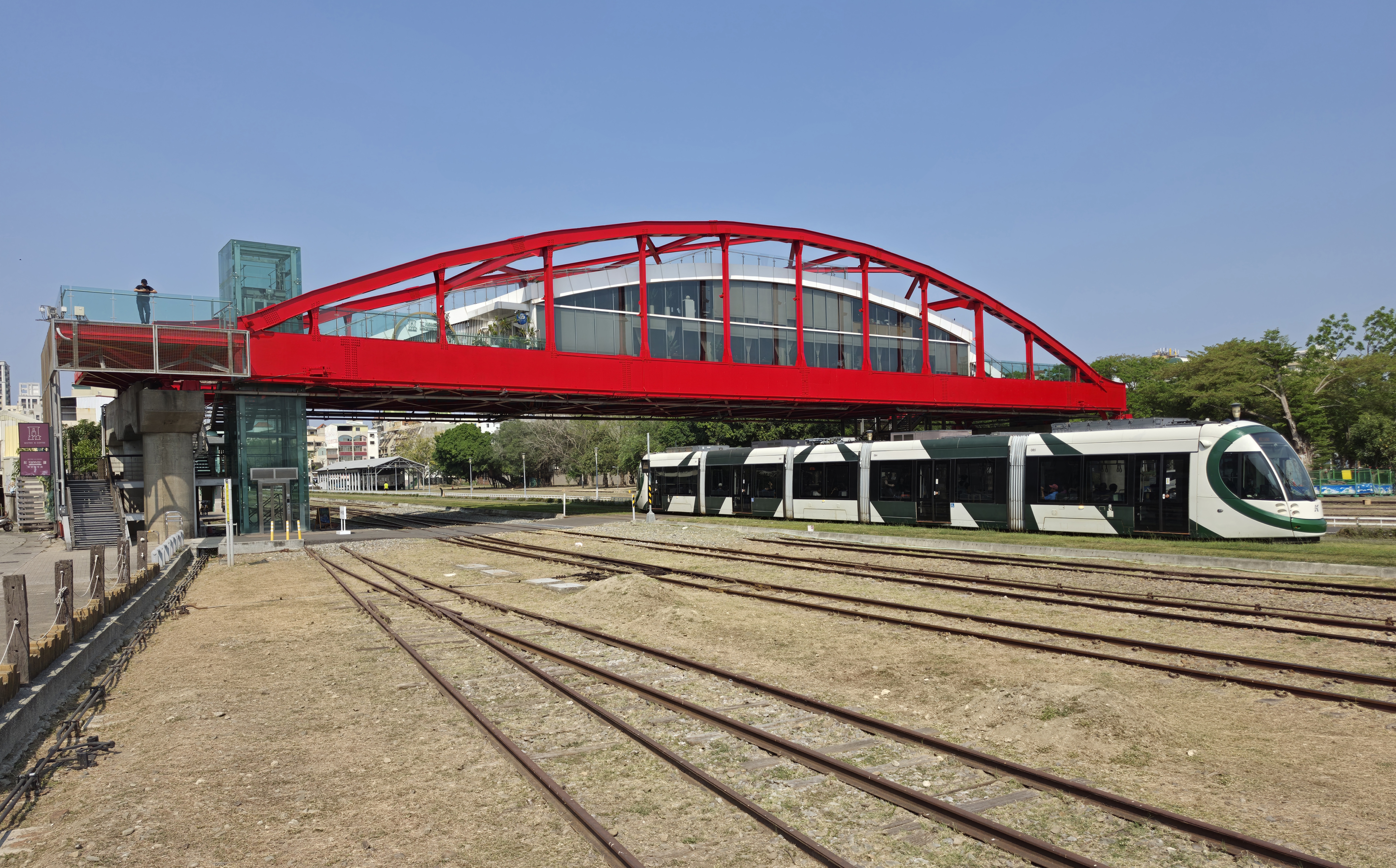
Sky Balcony with glass elevator and a Kaohsiung Light Rail tram passing beneath the deck

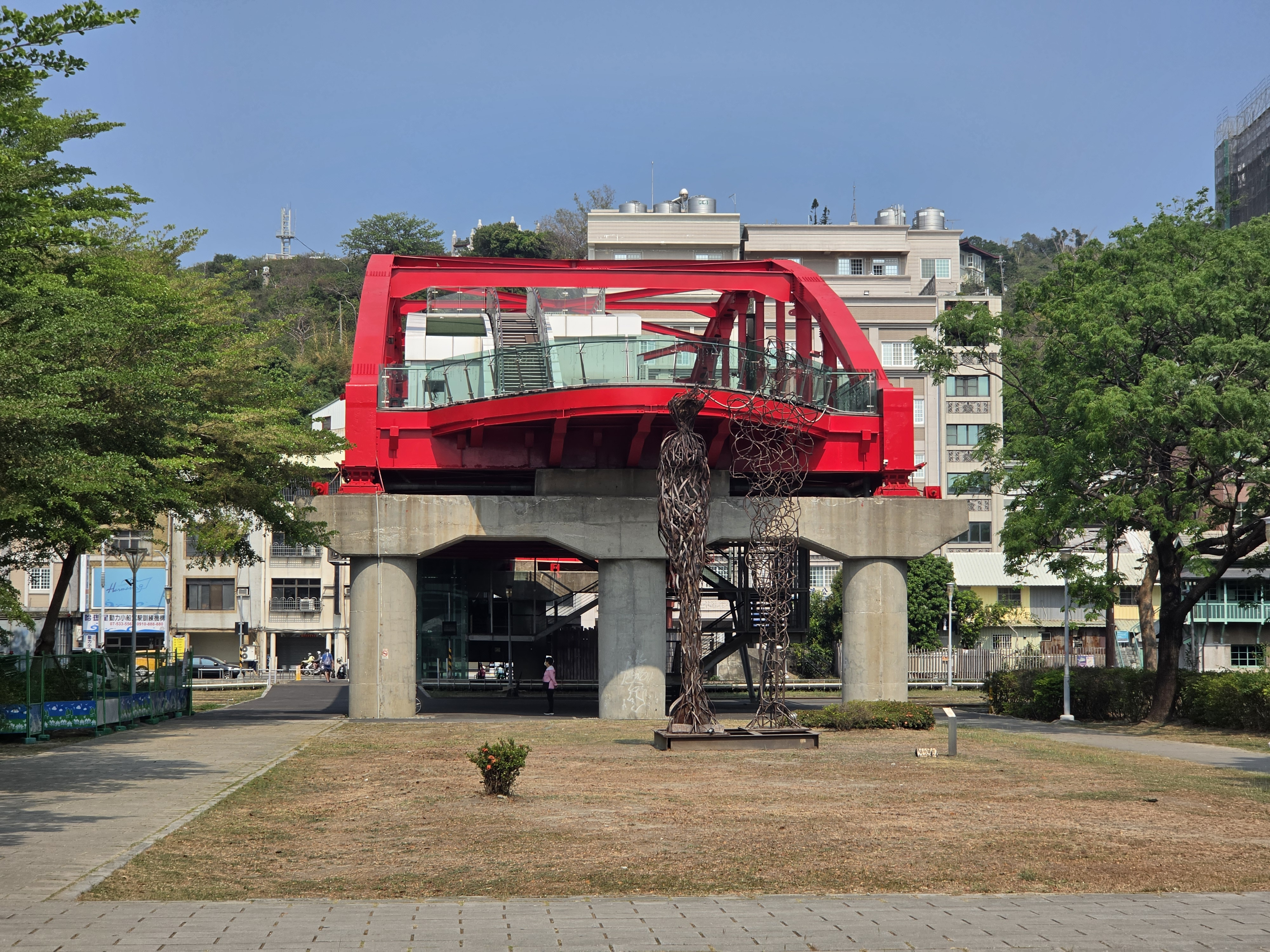
East view showing the elevated structure

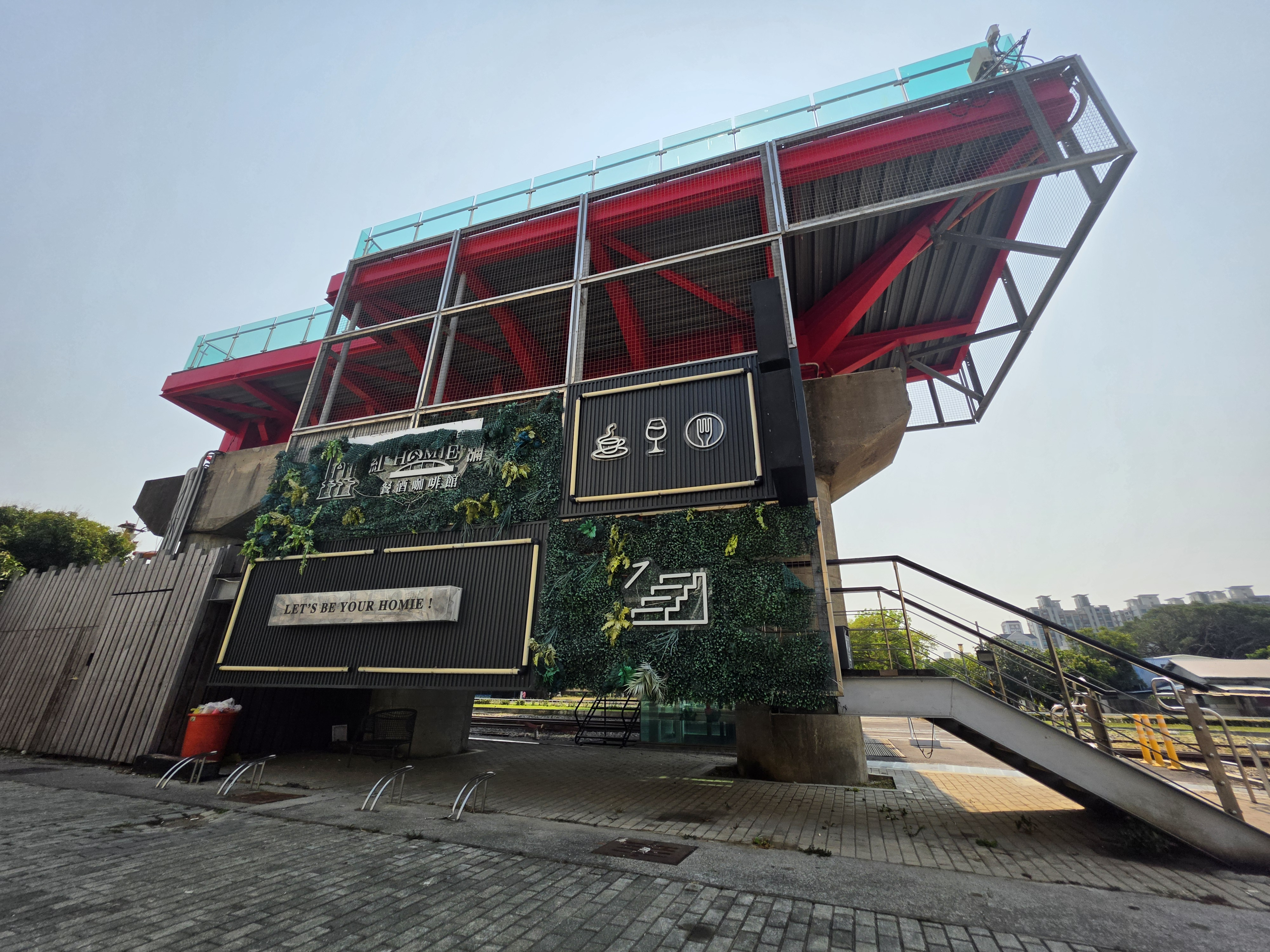
Restaurant and café space within the structure

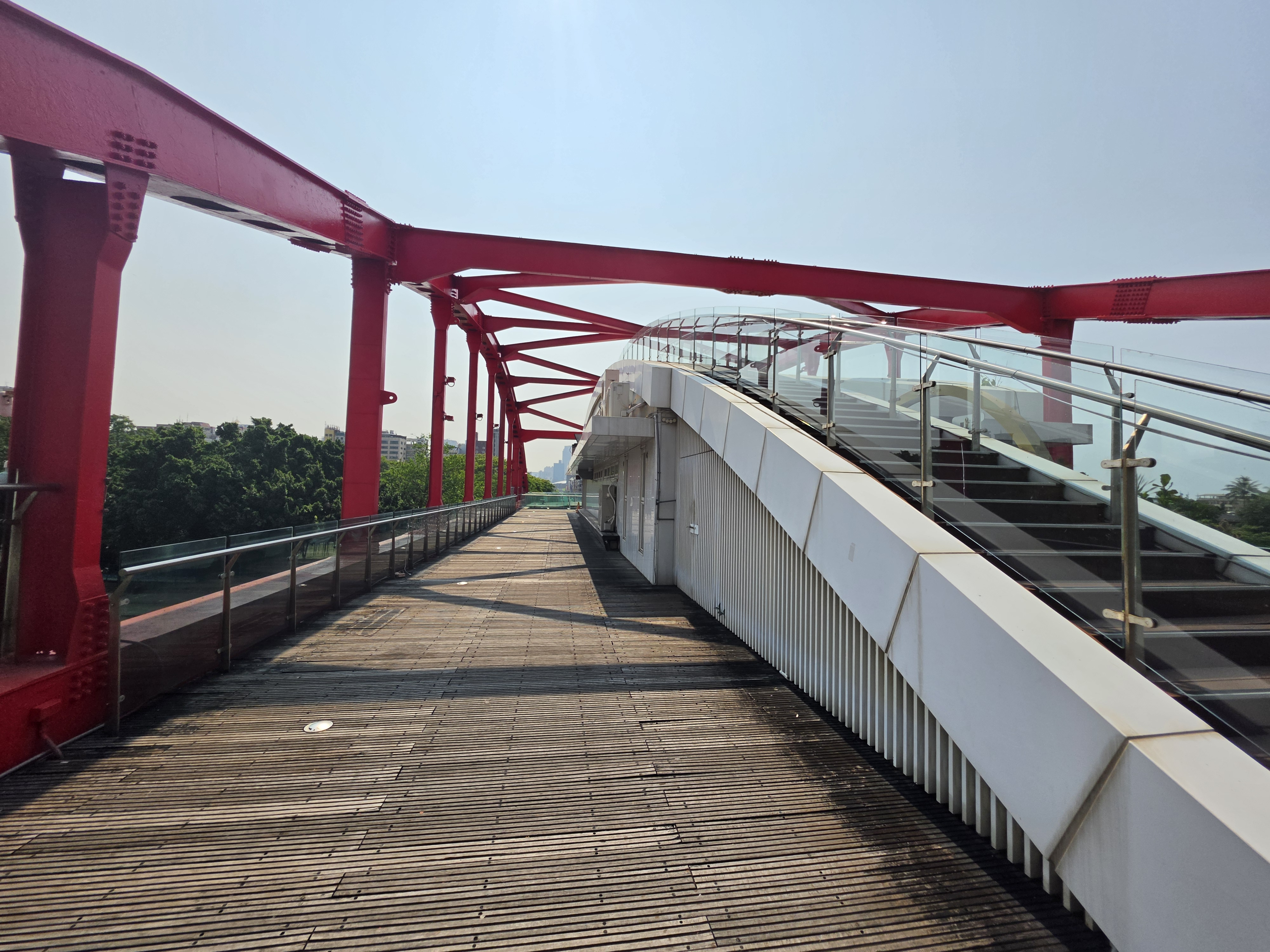
Walkway and stair access between elevated sections

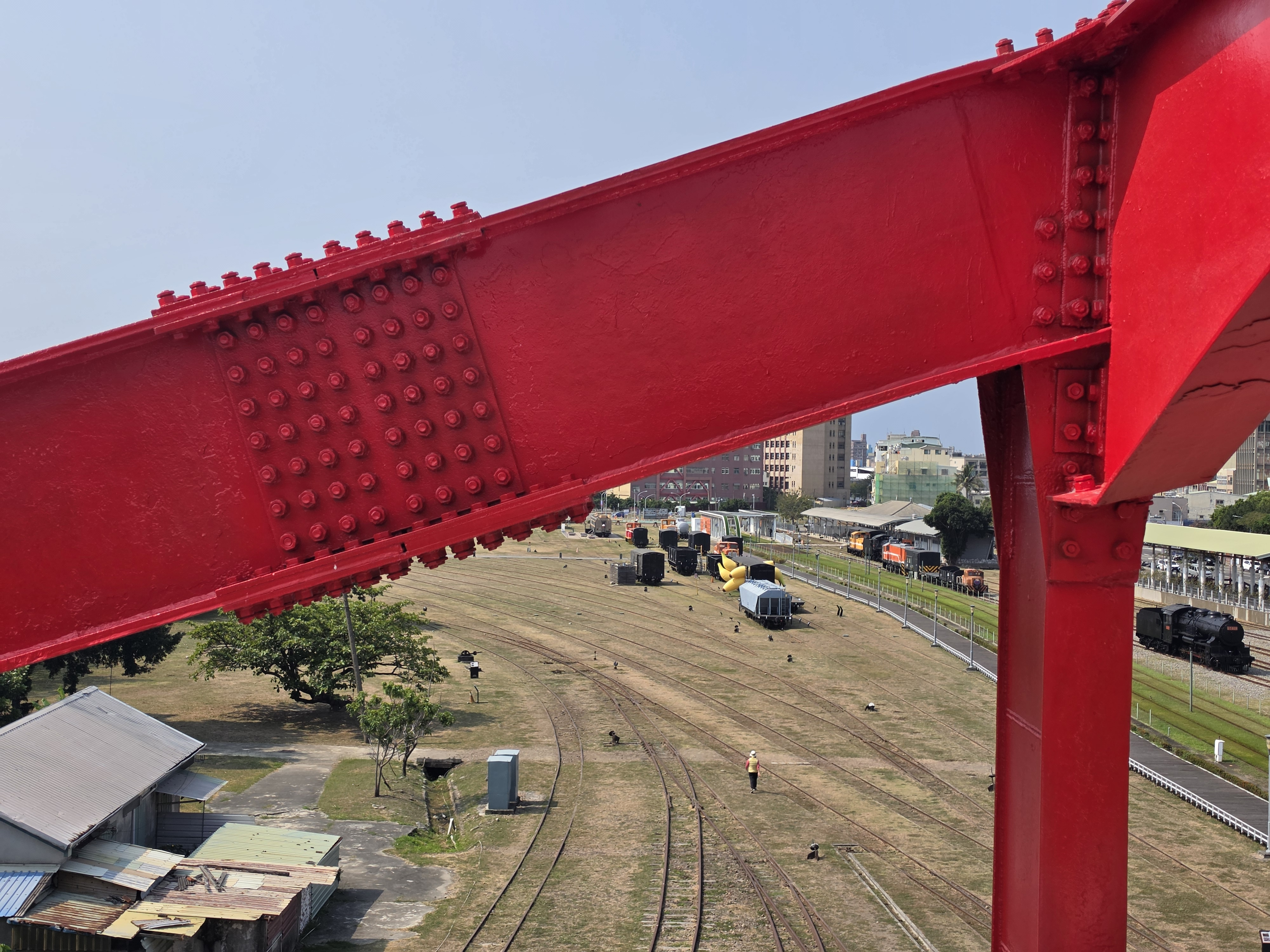
Riveted steel beam detail of the structure

== See also ==
- Kaohsiung Light Rail
- Gushan District
- Kaohsiung
