= List of state-owned enterprises of Taiwan =

Corporations such as CPC Corporation and Taiwan Financial Holdings Group are owned by the government of Taiwan (officially the Republic of China). Taiwan launched privatization programs in 1989.

== List of government-owned corporations ==
- CPC Corporation, Taiwan
- Chunghwa Post
- Export–Import Bank of the Republic of China
- Kaohsiung Port Land Development Corporation (50% with Kaohsiung City Government)
- Land Bank of Taiwan
- National Chung-Shan Institute of Science and Technology
- Taiwan Sugar Corporation
- Taiwan Power Company
- Taiwan Water Corporation
- Taiwan Financial Holdings Group
- Taiwan Tobacco and Liquor Corporation
- Taiwan Railways Corporation
- Taiwan International Ports Corporation
- Taiwan High Speed Rail Corporation
- Taoyuan International Airport Corporation
- Wang Film Productions (50% with Cartoon Network Studios/WarnerMedia)

== See also ==
- State-owned Enterprises Commission
- List of companies of Taiwan
