= Li Family Historical Residence =

Former residence in Gushan, Kaohsiung, Taiwan

- 內惟李氏古宅
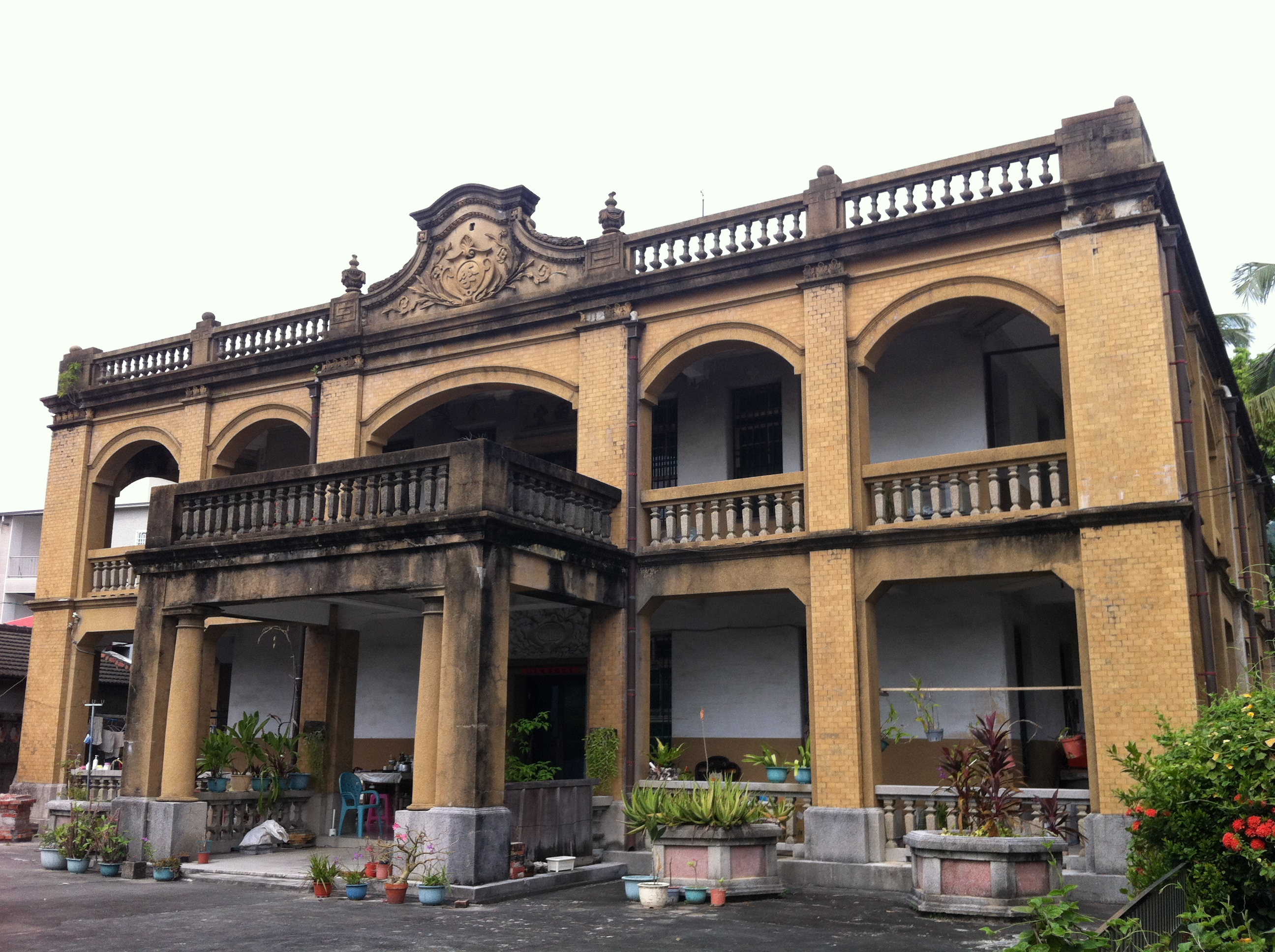
- Interactive map of the Li Family Historical Residence area

General information
- Type: former residence
- Architectural style: Baroque
- Location: Gushan, Kaohsiung, Taiwan
- Coordinates: 22°39′46.2″N 120°16′45.4″E
- Completed: 1931

Technical details
- Floor count: 2

The Li Family Historical Residence (Chinese: 內惟李氏古宅; pinyin: Nèiwéi Lǐ Shì Gǔzhái) is a historical house in Gushan District, Kaohsiung, Taiwan.

== History ==
The building was constructed in 1931 by Li Rong, the seventh generation descendant of the Li clan who migrated from Zhejiang to Taiwan.

== Architecture ==
The residence is a 2-story building designed with Baroque architecture style and a mixture of Western and oriental style. It has a symmetrical building layout design. The main hall and porch are located at the center of the building surrounded by arcade. Fences surrounding the building are tile-covered and the facade is stone-washed concrete.

== See also ==
- List of tourist attractions in Taiwan
