= Gushan District =

District in Kaohsiung, Taiwan

Coordinates: 22°38′56″N 120°16′21″E

Gushan 鼓山區
- District
- Gushan District
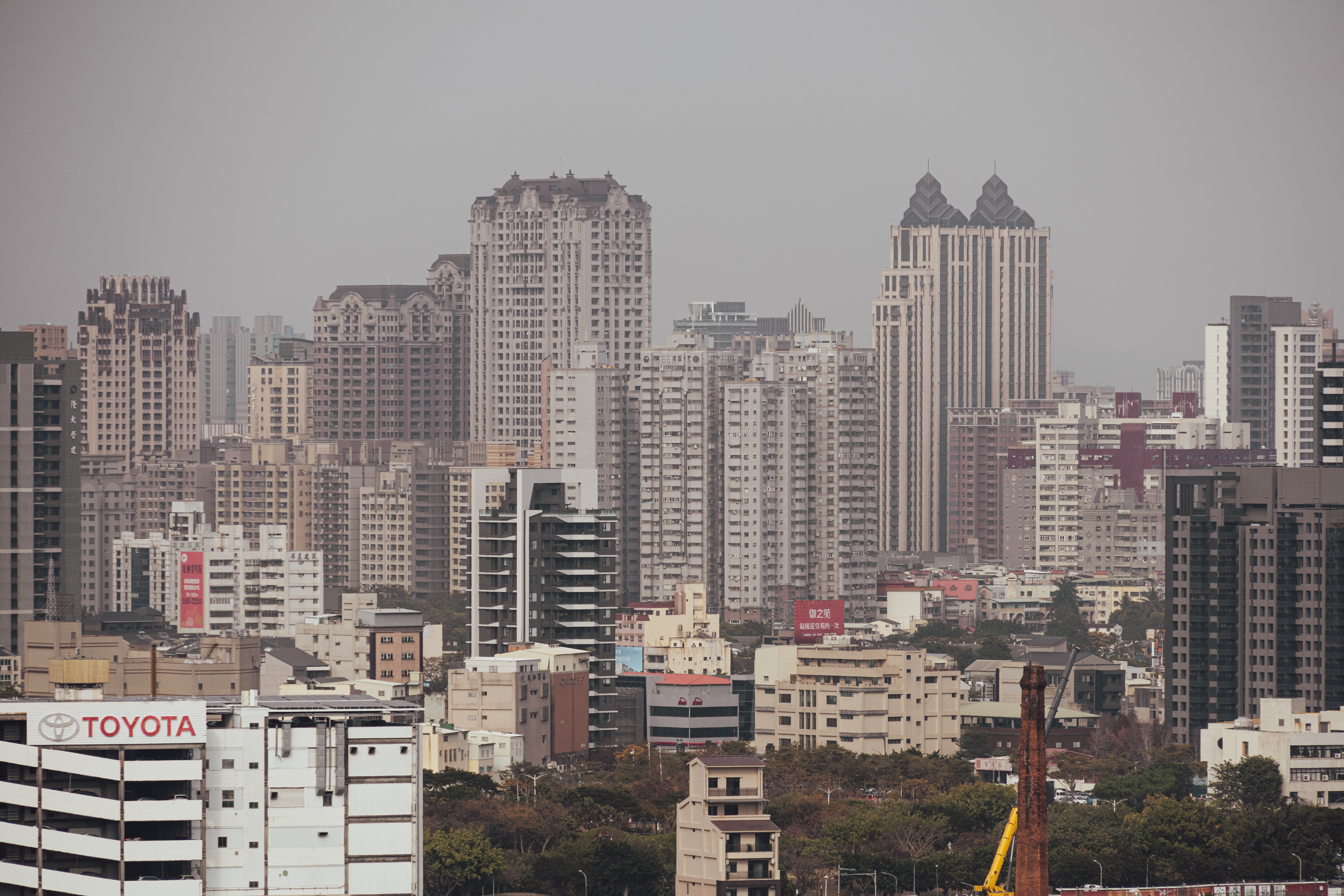

- Gushan District in Kaohsiung City
- Country: Taiwan
- Region: Southern Taiwan

Population (October 2023)
  - Total: 140,590
- Website: gushan-en.kcg.gov.tw

Gushan District (Chinese: 鼓山區; pinyin: Gǔshān Qū; Wade–Giles: Ku^{3}-shan^{1} Ch'ü^{1}) is district of Kaohsiung City, Taiwan.

== Administrative divisions ==
The district consists of Gufeng, Xiongfeng, Qianfeng, Guangrong, Minzu, Neiwei, Jianguo, Zhongzheng, Zijiang, Longjing, Zhengde, Pinghe, Minjiang, Housheng, Longzi, Longshui, Mingcheng, Huafeng, Yuxing, Yufeng, Guyan, Shude, Baoshu, Xingzong, Guanghua, Shanxia, Hebian, Luchuan, Dengshan, Fengnan, Lixing, Xinmin, Yanping, Weisheng, Huian, Shoushan, Shaochuantou and Taoyuan Village.

== Politics ==
The representative for Gushan on the city council is Lee Chiao-Ju.

== Education ==
=== Universities ===
- National Sun Yat-sen University

=== Schools ===
- Dominican International School Kaohsiung

== Tourist attractions ==
- Gushan Daitian Temple
- Former British Consulate at Takao
- Hamasing
- Sky Balcony
- Takao Railway Museum
- Former Sanhe Bank
- Former Yamagataya Bookstore
- Hamasen Trader Building
- Takao Renaissance Association
- Sinbin Old Street
- Kaohsiung Wude Hall
- Red Cross Center for Children (Former Japanese Patriotic Women's Association)
- Kaohsiung Port Warehouse No. 2 (former Kaohsiung Fisherman's Wharf)
- Kaohsiung Harbor Museum
- Hamasen Museum of Taiwan Railway
- Pier-2 Art Center
- North Gate of Xiong Town
- The Takao foreign cemetery
- Kaohsiung Martyrs' Shrine
- Longquan Temple
- Mount Shou
- Shou Shan Zoo
- Sizihwan
- Sizihwan Tunnel
- Li Family Historical Residence
- Kaohsiung Museum of Fine Arts

== Transportation ==
=== Light rail ===
Gushan is serviced by stations C13 to C24 of the Kaohsiung Circular Light Rail.

=== Railway ===
Gushan is serviced by three Taiwan Railway stations:

- Gushan Station
- Museum of Fine Arts Station
- Neiwei Station

=== Rapid transit ===
Gushan is serviced by the Sizihwan Station of the Orange Line and the Aozihdi Station of Red Line of the KMRT.

=== Water ===
The Cijin Ferry is operated between Gushan District and Cijin District by the government owned Kaohsiung Haboursteam Company (高雄輪船公司) between 6:00 AM and midnight with a one-way ticket price of NT$10.

== Notable natives ==
- Chu Hsing-yu, member of Legislative Yuan (1993–2005)
- Huang Fei, singer
