= Su'ao railway station =

Railway station in Taiwan

Su'ao Station 蘇澳車站
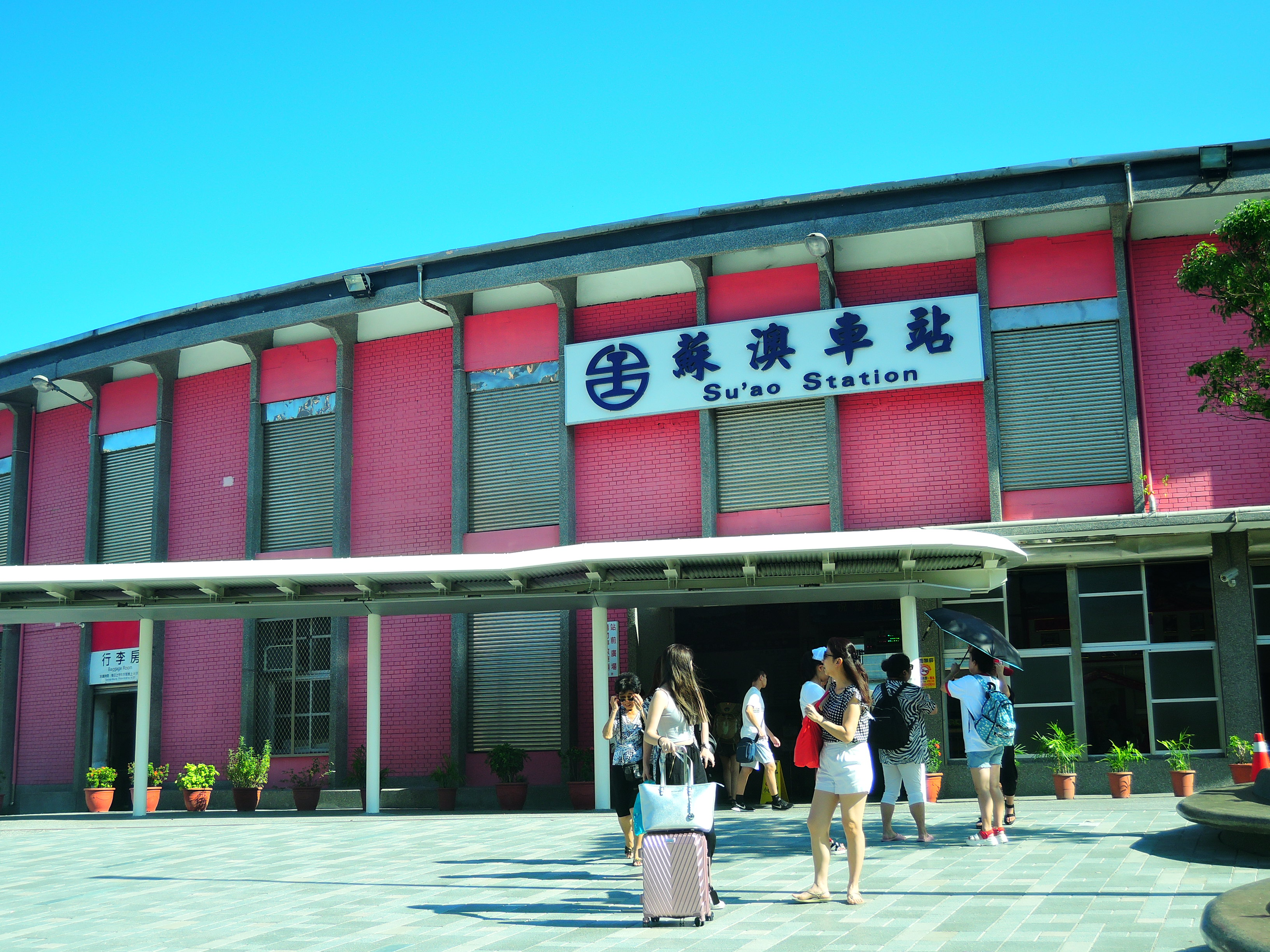

General information
- Location: Su'ao, Yilan County, Taiwan
- Coordinates: 24°35′43.14″N 121°51′4.68″E
- System: Train station
- Owner: Taiwan Railway Corporation
- Operator: Taiwan Railway Corporation
- Line: Eastern Trunk line
- Train operators: Taiwan Railway Corporation

History
- Opened: 1919-03-24

Passengers
- 1,004 daily (2024)

Services
Preceding station	Taiwan Railway	Following station
Su'aoxin Terminus	Eastern Trunk line Su'ao branch	Terminus
Location

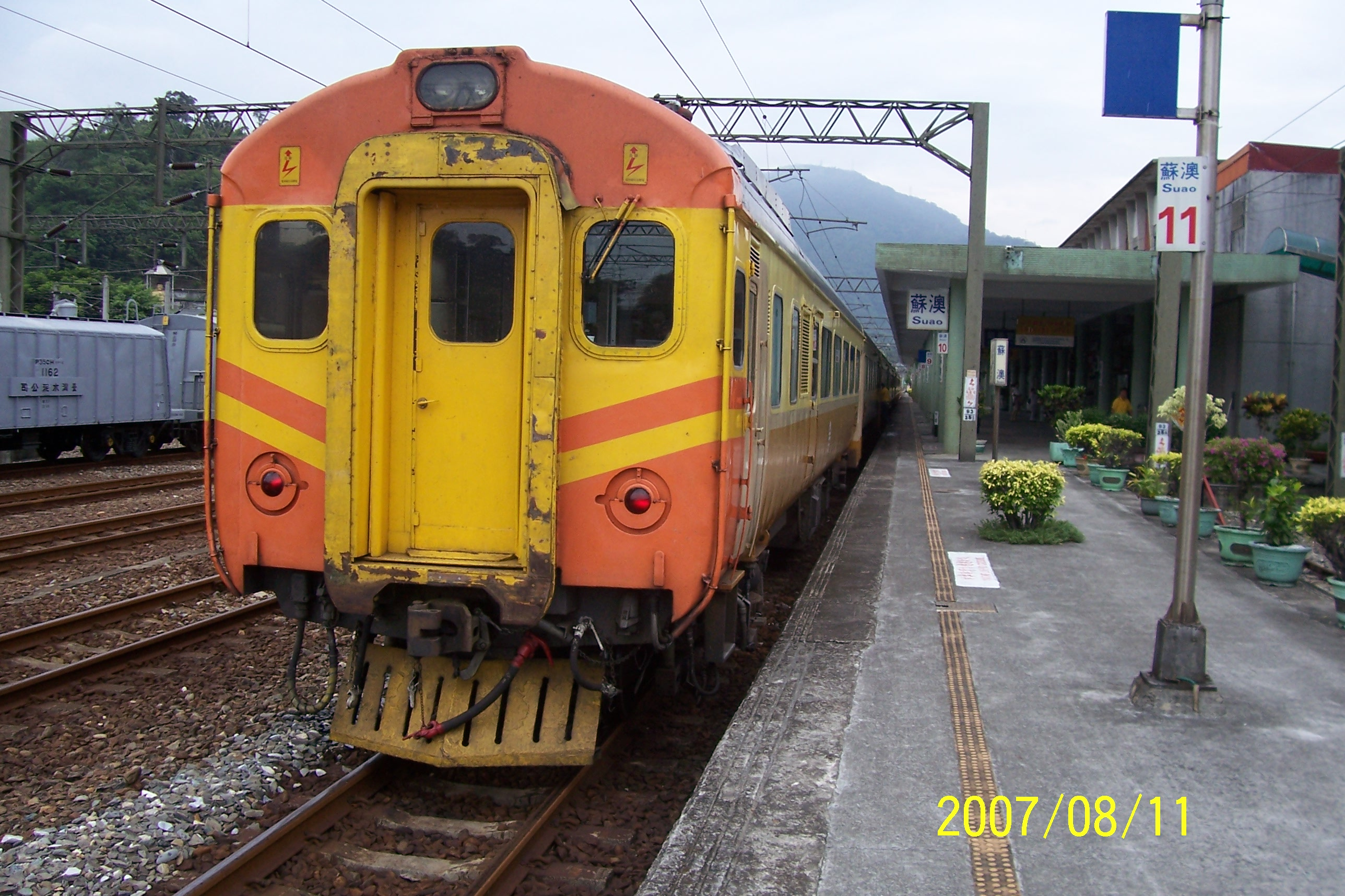
Su'ao station platform

Su'ao (Chinese: 蘇澳車站; pinyin: Sūào Chēzhàn) is a railway station on the Taiwan Railway Yilan line. It is located in Su'ao Township, Yilan County, Taiwan and is the southern terminus of the Yilan line.

The station was opened on 24 March 1919.

There is one side platform.

== Around the station ==
Outline map of the stations near Su'ao

- Coral Museum
- Nanfang'ao Bridge
- Neipi Beach
- Su'ao Cold Spring
- Su'ao Fortress
- Tofu Cape
- Zhu Dayu Culture Museum

== See also ==
- List of railway stations in Taiwan
