= Yin miao =

Temples for people who died prematurely

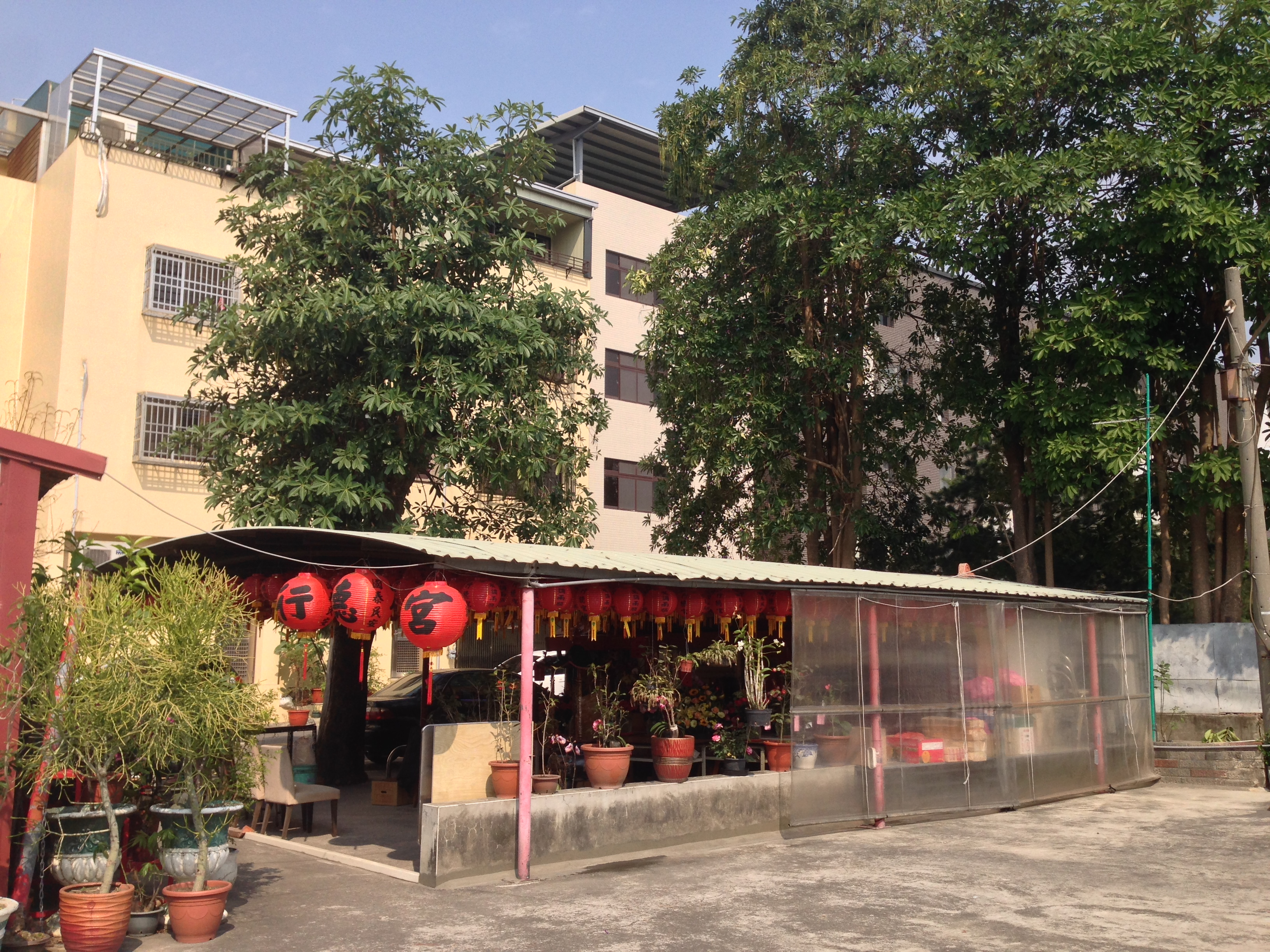
Xingde Temple in Taiping District, Taichung, dedicated to an unnamed Filipino migrant worker that drowned

In Taiwanese folk religion, yin miao (Chinese: 陰廟; pinyin: Yīnmiào; lit. 'dark temple') are temples dedicated to wandering and homeless spirits, as opposed to yang miao, which are dedicated to deities. According to local beliefs, ghosts without a permanent resting place (as in a grave) wander in the human realm and may cause trouble for the living. Therefore, yin miao serve as such resting places for these spirits as a form of respect and to maintain peace. Temples dedicated to deities associated with afterlife, like Cheng Huang Ye or Di Zang Wang, are not considered yin miao.

== Architecture and location ==
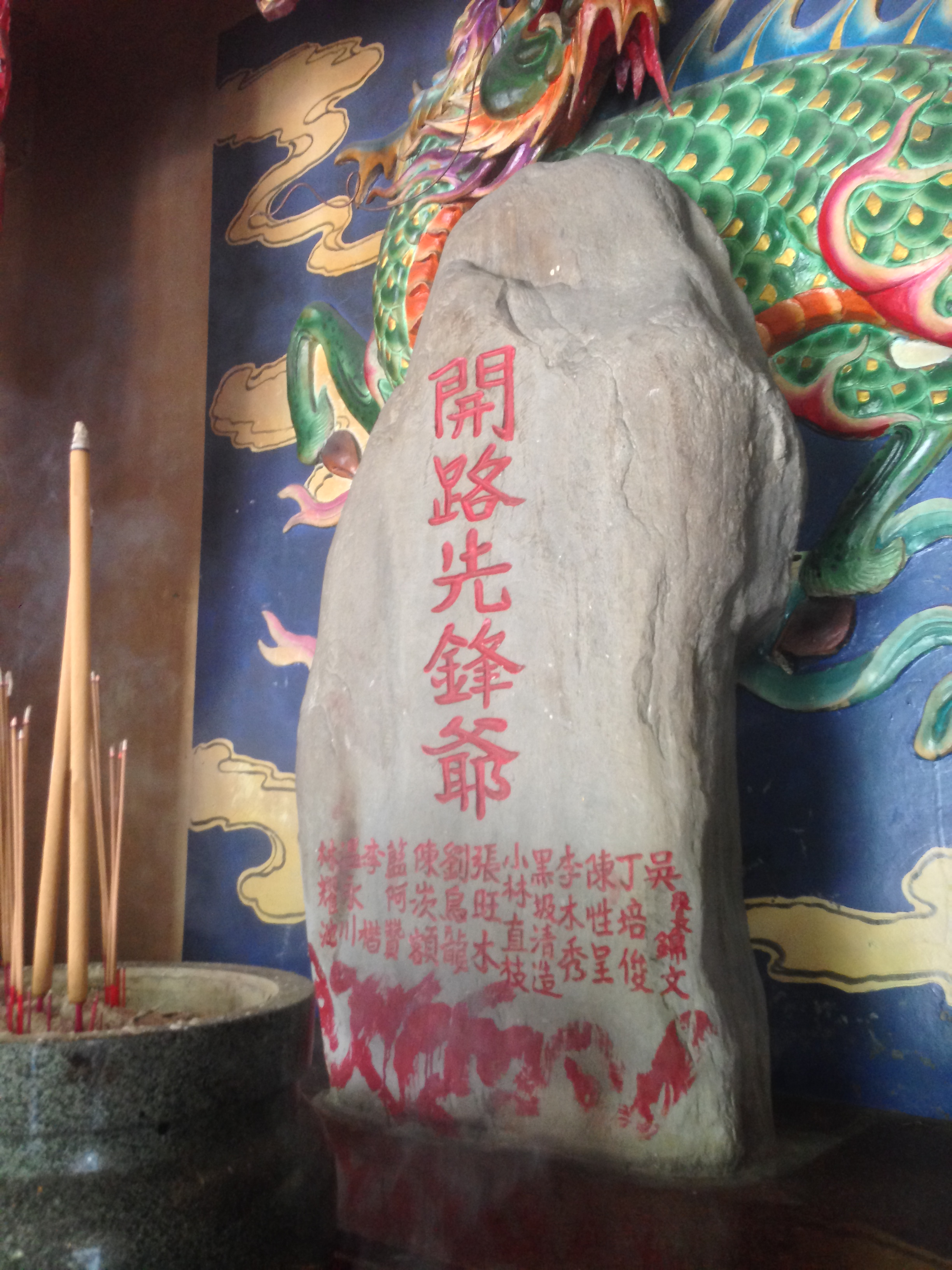
A plaque inscribed with the names of those who died building Suhua Highway, located on the altar of Kailu Xianfengye Temple in Su'ao, Yilan County

As opposed to yang miao, yin miao are typically much smaller and less decorated. Yin miao will often display the words Yǒuqíobìyìng (有求必應). There are usually no paifang or any menshen at the entrance, and there are usually no statues inside the hall at all. However, some do get reconstructed into larger temples with more elaborate decorations.

Yin miao are often built near the sites of mass graves, battle sites, unmarked graves, and treacherous terrain where accidents happen. For example, Keelung's Laodagong Temple is dedicated to those who died during conflicts between Quanzhou and Zhangzhou settlers. Shezi Island in Taipei's Shilin District has a high concentration of yin miao for the corpses that float down the Tamsui River and get lodged there.

Some yin miao are dedicated to deceased unmarried women. In Chinese culture, ancestor worship is only done to men and women that married into the family, and a family cannot worship a woman that never left that family. Therefore, yin miao are built outside for these women, which are often named Gūniáng miào (姑娘廟).

== Worship ==
According to Taiwanese beliefs, worship in a yin miao should be done deliberately and carefully. Therefore, children are often told to not worship in random temples. Typically, only silver joss paper is burned (instead of gold) since the temple doesn't house a deity.

== Girl temples ==
Girl temples are yin miao dedicated to the spirits of unmarried women who have died early.

The origins of these shrines can be traced back to the custom of ghost marriage, where the spirits of unmarried women are paired with a deceased man in order to have offspring and become ancestors. Another method of settling these spirits is through the creation of a girl shrine, which is similar to the official culture of placing men.

Girl shrines in Taiwan are rare and were not recorded during the Qing dynasty. However, they have become more prevalent in recent times due to the patrilineal society, which does not allow unmarried women to be enshrined in ancestral halls. Famous examples of girl shrines in Taiwan include Sister Lintou, Wei Bian Girl Temple, Mrs. Chitou, Qiu Girl Temple, and Wufei Temple. The patriarchal social concept of the Han people in the early days of Taiwan believed that girls who died before marriage would not be able to enjoy incense and become hungry ghosts. These girl temples are usually built in the place where the girl died or where her grave or corpse was found, and are usually relatively remote and less crowded.

In the 1970s, many girl temples became holy places for gamblers.

== Notable yin miao ==
- Kailu Xianfengye Temple
- Maling Temple
- Princess Babao Temple
- Temple of the Eighteen Lords

== See also ==
- Ancestor veneration in China
- Chinese folk religion
- Folk religion
- Ghost Festival
- Gion cult
- Hitogami
- Onmyōdō / Onmyōji
- Righteous People's Faith
- Spirit tablet
- Taiwanese superstitions
- The common end of myriad good deeds
- Tenjin (kami)
- Wayside shrine
- Wutong Shen
