= Suao River =

River in Taiwan

Coordinates: 24°35′58″N 121°51′32″E

Suao River (Traditional Chinese: 蘇澳溪) is located in the northeastern part of Taiwan. The main stream has a length of 8.83 kilometers, and the watershed area is 29.65 square kilometers. It is distributed in the central area of Suao Township, Yilan County. The upper reaches of the main stream are formed by the Bai Mi River, which originates from the source of the Coarse Pit Creek. The source is on the northeast side of the West Hat Mountain at an elevation of 966 meters. It flows northeast to near the Coarse Pit, where it changes its name to Bai Mi River. Then it turns east and flows to the vicinity of the Yungchun Station on the North Link Railway. After merging with another tributary, the Zuntoukeng Creek, it is renamed the Suao River. The river then turns north, passing through Hudong and Gongguan Keng, and finally flows into the Pacific Ocean at the Suao Harbor.
