= Death in vain =

Chinese term for death

In the Sinosphere, a death in vain (枉死 wangsi, 冤死 yuansi, 屈死 qusi) is a death that is not a death of natural causes, such as a suicide, homicide, or an accident, which is an unjust death. For example, in Journey to the West: "Those people are the ghosts of the 64 places of smoke, the 72 places of grass, the princes and the chiefs, all of whom died in vain, and have no money and no control, and cannot be reborn, and are all lonely and hungry." In the Travels of Lao Can: "I can go, but it is not useful to the business, but to add one more wrongful death in the cage."

Chinese people often set up temples for people who died in accidents, called Yin miao, hoping that after these people died in vain, they would be placated with jisi (offerings) and not disturb the human world.

== See also ==
- Goryō
- Yin miao
- Chinese hero cult
- Heroic Martyrs Shrine
- Wrongful death claim
