= Tofu Cape =

Cape in Su'ao, Yilan County, Taiwan

Tofu Cape 豆腐岬
- Cape
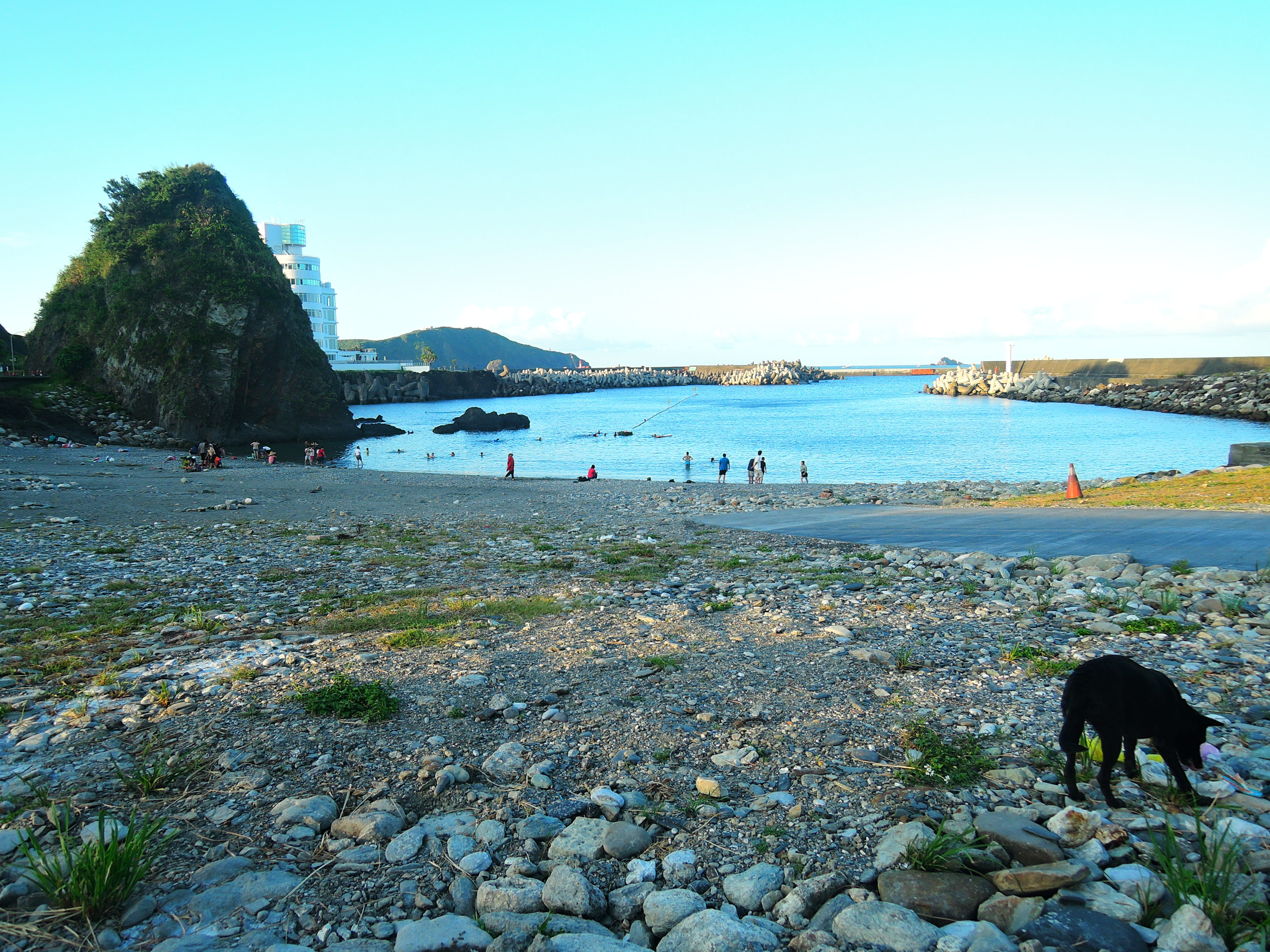

- Taiwan
- Coordinates: 24°34′53.9″N 121°52′24.0″E
- Location: Su'ao, Yilan County, Taiwan
- Geology: cape

The Tofu Cape (Chinese: 豆腐岬; pinyin: Dòufu Jiǎ) is a cape in Su'ao Township, Yilan County, Taiwan.

== Name ==
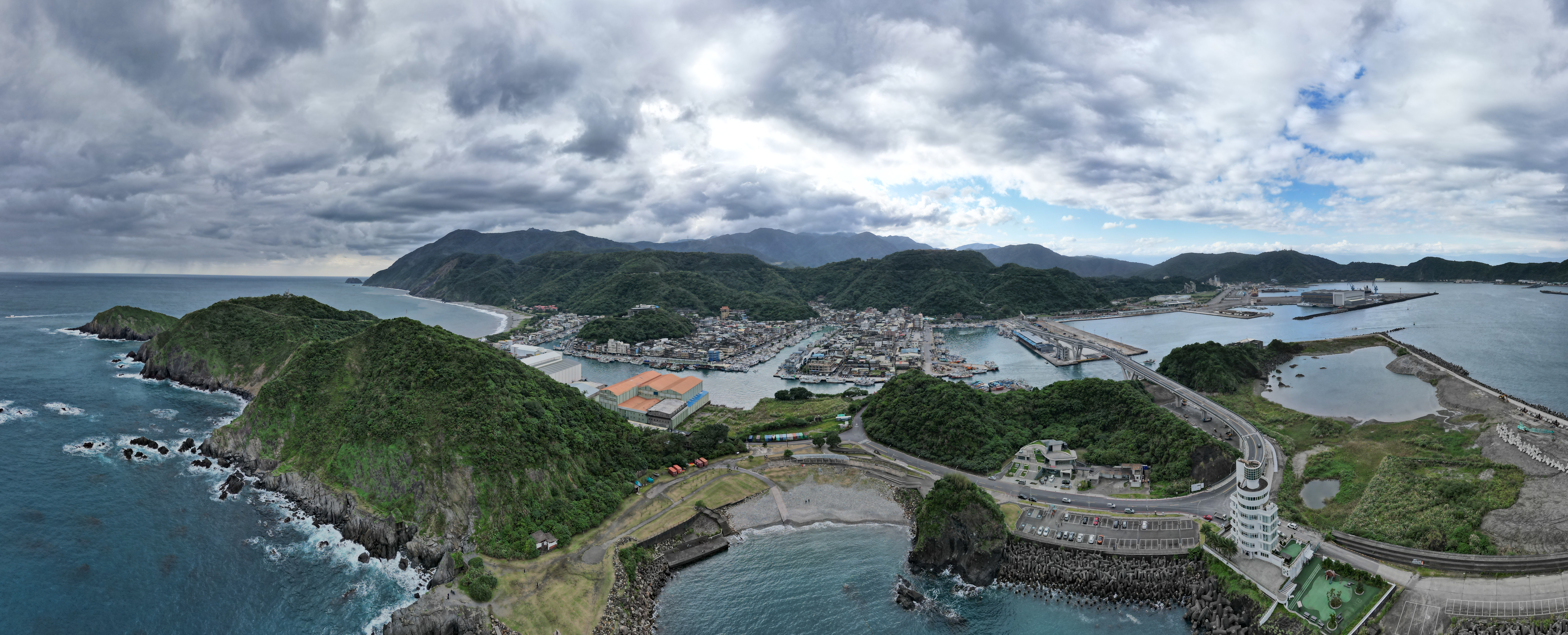
Su'Ao's Tofu Cape from above. Shot December 2022.

The cape got its name, because the rock on the area resembles tofu.

== Ecology ==
The cape provides a natural shelter for the sea fish nearby.

== Activities ==
There is a hiking trail along the coastal line of the cape. The area is also popular for scuba diving.

== Transportation ==
The cape is accessible within walking distance southeast of Su'ao Station of Taiwan Railway.

== See also ==
- Geology of Taiwan
