= Temple of the Eighteen Lords =

Temple in Shimen, New Taipei, Taiwan

- 乾華十八王公廟
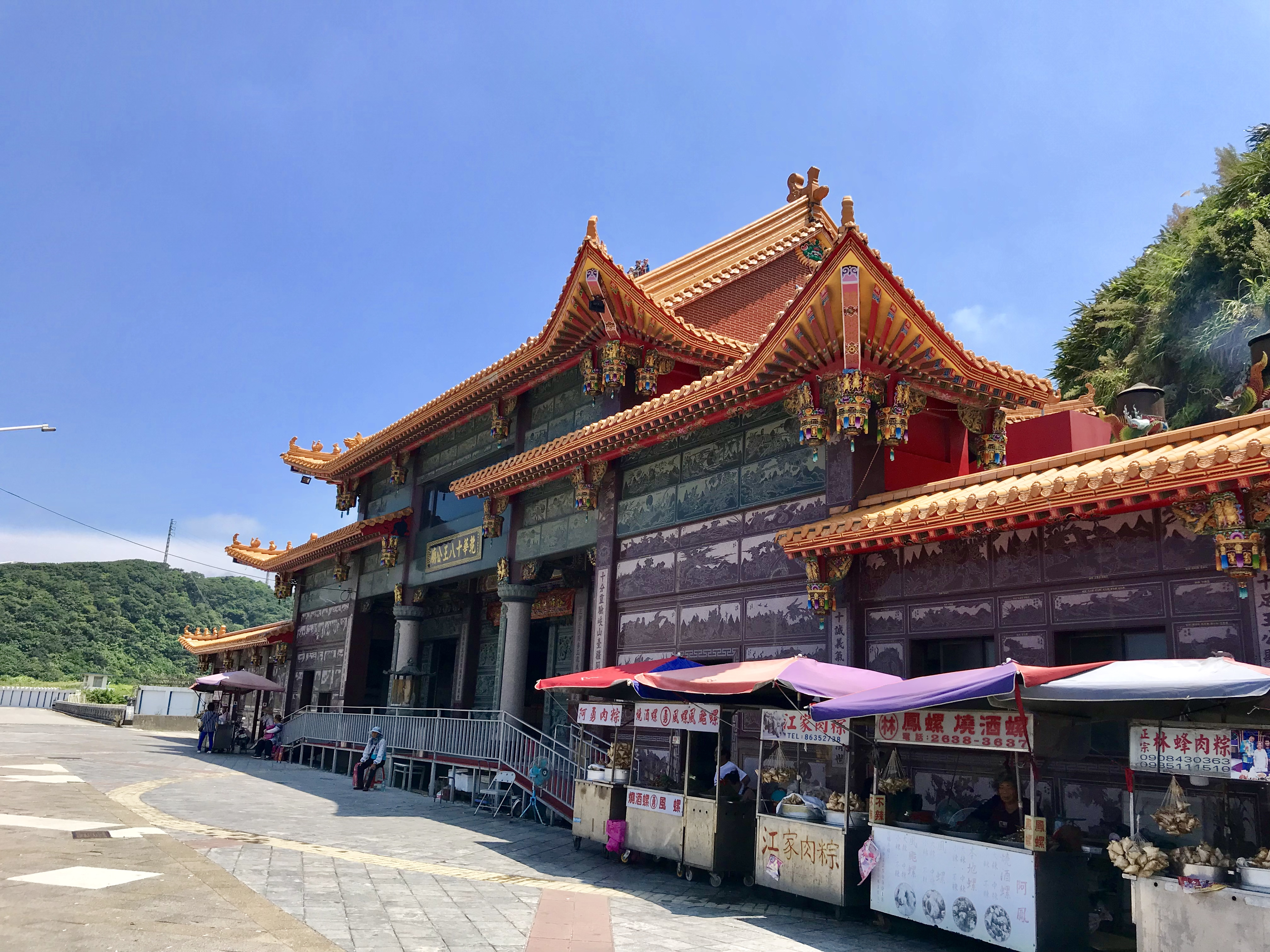
- Temple facade

Religion
- Affiliation: Taoism

Location
- Location: Shimen District, New Taipei
- Country: Taiwan
- Interactive map of Temple of the Eighteen Lords
- Coordinates: 25.2919°N 121.5863°E

Architecture
- Completed: 1975

Temple of the Eighteen Lords (Chinese: 乾華十八王公廟; pinyin: Gānhuá Shíbāwáng Gōngmiào) is a yin miao (temple for deceased people) located in Ganhua Village, Shimen District, New Taipei, Taiwan. Located on Provincial Highway 2 beside Jinshan Nuclear Power Plant, the temple is dedicated to seventeen deceased sailors and one dog.

== History ==
According to legend, during the Qing Dynasty, a boat carrying seventeen people and one dog capsized near the coast of northern Taiwan. All of the people died, but the dog survived. When residents on the shore were burying the dead, the dog jumped into the grave to be buried as well. (Note: Some say that the dog jumped into the ocean.) Locals then immortalized them collectively as the "Eighteen Lords".

The grave was maintained by the Lian family (練) living in Ganhua Village. In the 1960s, a small shrine was built at the grave, and in 1975, the Lian family built a larger temple for the eighteen spirits. At the time, temples must worship one of the forty-seven deities recognized by the government to register as a legal entity, so the Lian marked it as a temple for Guanyin, who has a smaller altar besides the Eighteen Lords. Though this restriction was later lifted, temple officials said that they don't plan on changing its registration.

In the 1980s, the temple was popular among gamblers playing dajiale (a type of illegal lottery) and sex workers. That led to food stalls flocking into the temple parking lot to cater to the visitors. According to Shimen District mayor Wu Zong-ren, there were roughly one hundred stalls outside the temple during its peak. In particular, the makeshift market's zongzi became very famous: a stall named "Liu's Zongzi" grew into a chain store with branches throughout Taipei. The temple's popularity diminished when Provincial Highway 2 was moved northwards onto a wider bridge, which redirected the traffic away from the temple and blocked its view of the ocean.

In 1994, a new temple was built in the hills above Jinshan Nuclear Power Plant. The new temple has a very large dog statue overlooking the ocean, and visitors can walk inside it and climb to the dog's eyes.

== Worship ==
As a yin miao, the Temple of the Eighteen Lords is popular among people involved with the underworld of society, particularly gamblers and sex workers. Both temples have many statues of dogs, and touching them is said to attract wealth, as shown in a local saying:

摸狗頭住大樓
摸狗身得萬金
摸狗嘴大富貴
摸狗尾賺傢伙
摸狗肚做好頭路
摸狗耳賺錢滿滿是
摸狗角金銀滿厝角

Translation:

Touch the dog's head and live in a big apartment
Touch the dog's body and get ten thousand gold
Touch the dog's mouth and be very wealthy
Touch the dog's tail and earn material possessions
Touch the dog's stomach and work a good job
Touch the dog's ears and earn lots of money
Touch the dog's feet and fill your house with money

According to tradition, hot food must be given to the eighteen lords since they died at sea. This is why the stalls outside the temple mostly sell hot food like zongzi, stewed whelk, sticky rice, and sesame oil chicken. Some people also bring cigarettes. Worshippers also claim that the temple's "powers" are stronger at night.

== See also ==
- Yin Miao
- Changfu Temple, Sanxia District
- Dharma Drum Mountain, Jinshan District
- List of temples in Taiwan
- Dogs in religion
