= Zhu Dayu Culture Museum =

Museum in Su'ao, Yilan County, Taiwan

- 祝大漁物產文創館
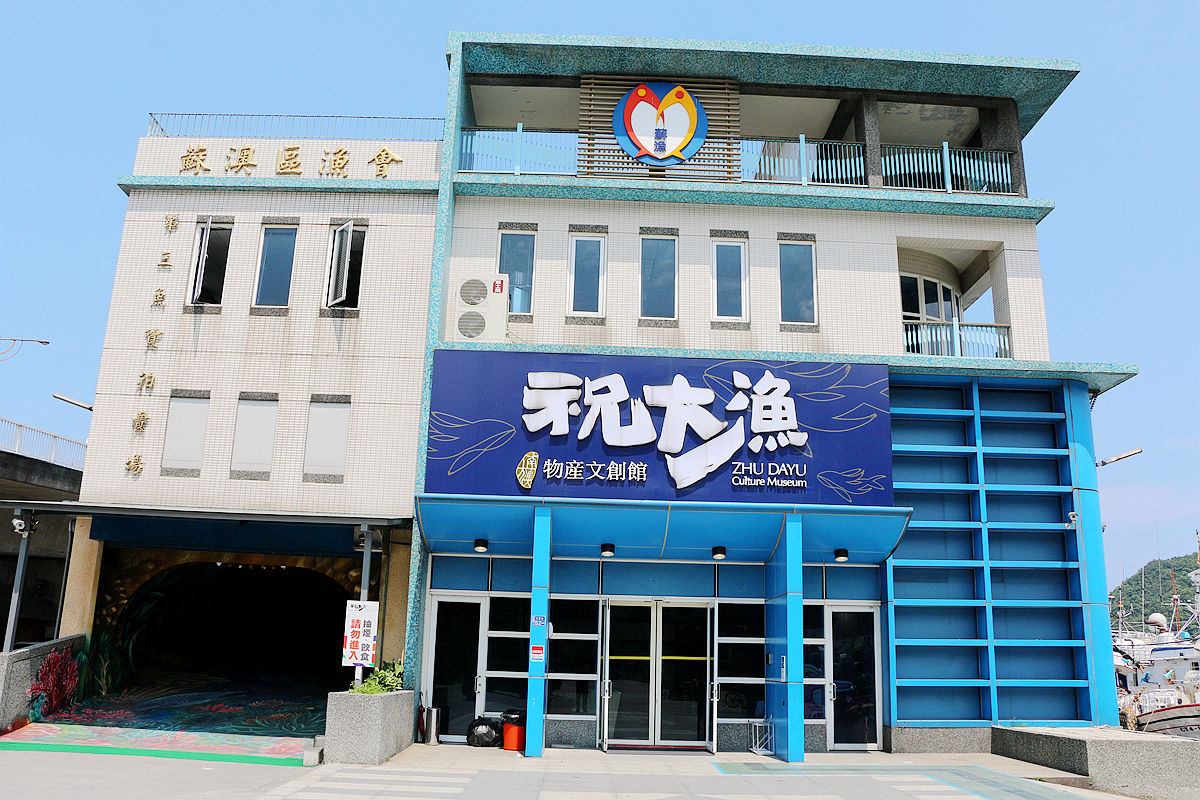
- Location: Su'ao, Yilan County, Taiwan
- Coordinates: 24°35′07.2″N 121°51′59.4″E
- Type: museum

The Zhu Dayu Culture Museum (traditional Chinese: 祝大漁物產文創館; simplified Chinese: 祝大渔物产文创馆; pinyin: Zhù Dàyú Wùchǎn Wénchuàngguǎn) is a museum about fish in Su'ao Township, Yilan County, Taiwan.

== Exhibition ==
The museum exhibits various artifacts and information regarding sea creatures and their food products, such as red coral, canned fish, fixed-meal packages, fresh foods etc.

== Transportation ==
The museum is accessible within walking distance southeast of Su'ao Station of Taiwan Railway.

== See also ==
- List of museums in Taiwan
