= Su'ao Fortress =

Former fort in Su'ao, Yilan County, Taiwan

- 蘇澳砲台
- Su'ao, Yilan County, Taiwan
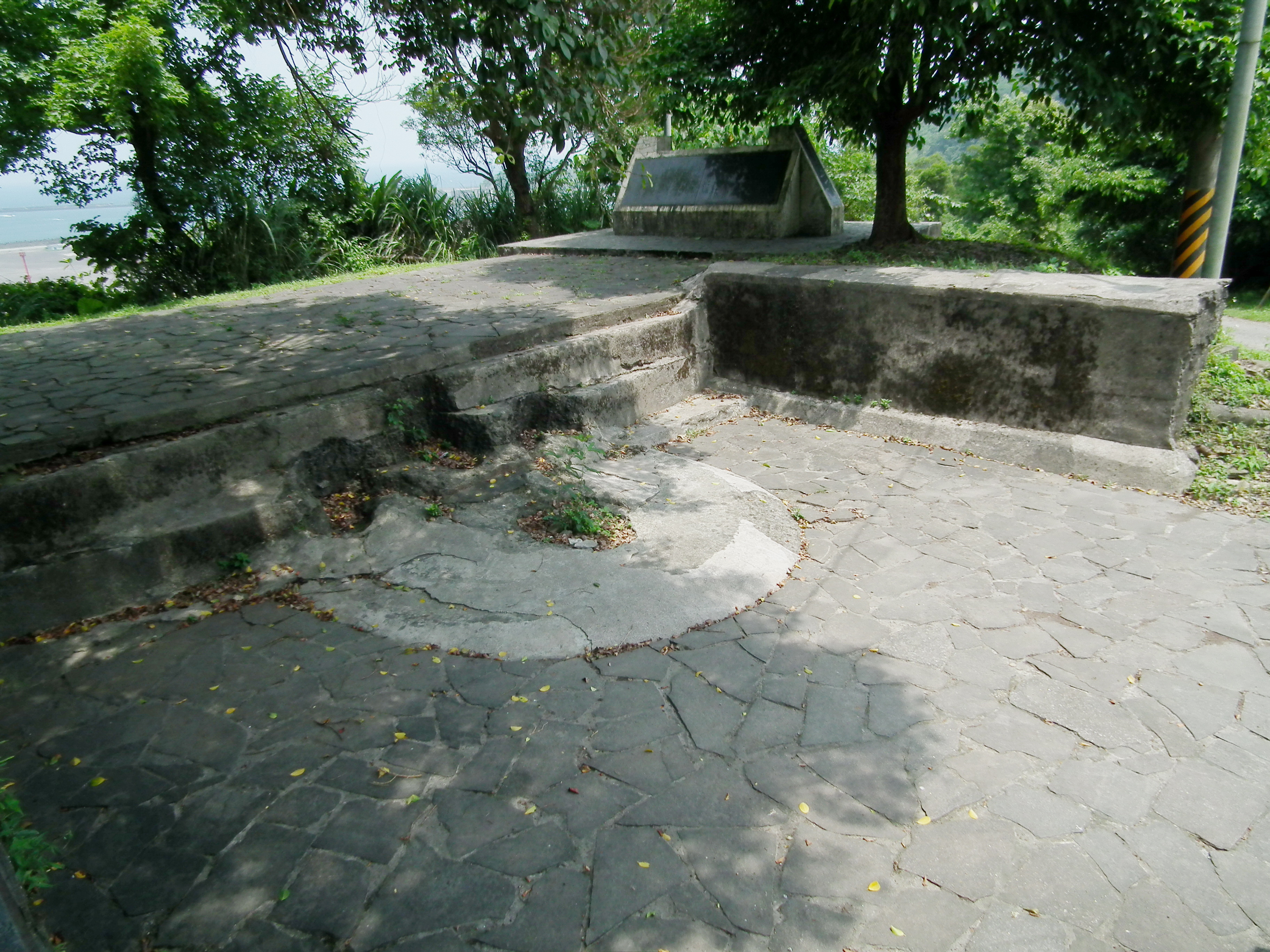

Site information
- Type: fort

Location
- Taiwan
- Coordinates: 24°35′36.0″N 121°51′24.8″E

Site history
- Built: 1889

The Su'ao Fortress (traditional Chinese: 蘇澳砲台; simplified Chinese: 苏澳炮台; pinyin: Sū'ào Pàotái) is a former fort in Su'ao Township, Yilan County, Taiwan.

== History ==
In 1889, the French Empire attempted to invade Taiwan in Su'ao. The Qing Dynasty decided to build coastal forts and barracks to defend the area from the French.

== Architecture ==
The fort was built at an altitude of 200 meters.

== Transportation ==
The fort is accessible within walking distance east of Su'ao Station of Taiwan Railway.

== See also ==
- List of tourist attractions in Taiwan
