= Kailu Xianfengye Temple =

Temple in Su'ao, Yilan County

- 開路先鋒爺廟
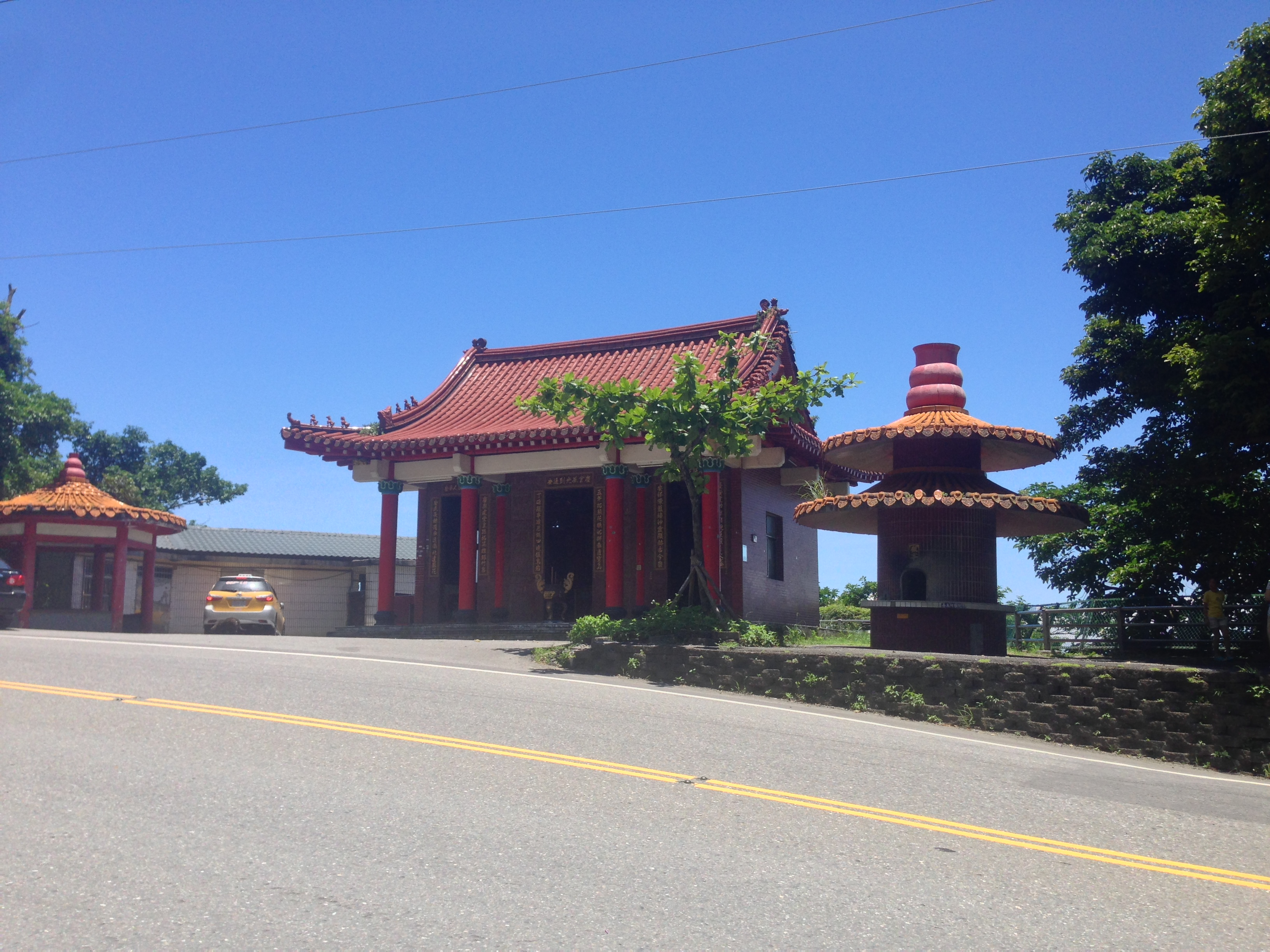

Religion
- Affiliation: Chinese folk religion

Location
- Location: Su'ao, Yilan County
- Country: Taiwan
- Interactive map of Kailu Xianfengye Temple
- Coordinates: 24.5247°N 121.8503°E

Architecture
- Completed: 1994
- Direction of façade: North

Kailu Xianfengye Temple (Chinese: 開路先鋒爺廟; pinyin: Kāilù Xiānfēngyé Miào), alternatively known as Qing'an Shrine (Chinese: 慶安堂; pinyin: Qìng'ān Táng), is a martyr's shrine located in Su'ao Township, Yilan County, Taiwan. The shrine is dedicated to the thirteen men that lost their lives building Suhua Highway.

== Overview ==
Kailu Xianfengye Temple is a yin miao located on the old section of Suhua Highway on Provincial Highway 9D, sitting above a steep cliff overlooking the Pacific Ocean. Suhua Highway is the only road connection between Yilan County and Hualien County and is notoriously dangerous due to its mountainous terrain.

On the altar, there is a stone plaque inscribed with "Kailu Xianfengye", roughly translating to "god of road construction pioneers", and the names of thirteen workers that perished during the road's construction. Two of those people are Japanese; the rest are Taiwanese. The latest to be inscripted is Ding Pei-jun (丁培俊), who died in 1973.

== History ==
During Japan's rule over Taiwan, the Japanese government conducted a series of projects to widen Suhua Highway from a footpath to a road. During the construction, two Japanese workers lost their lives. Therefore, in December 1917, a plaque was erected in their honor. As the construction progressed into the Republic of China era, the total death count rose to thirteen. A small shrine was constructed containing a memorial plaque, and the building was named Qing'an Shrine.

In 1994, Lee Chao-song (李朝松), a subcontractor for construction work on the highway, believed that the thirteen men that perished have been protecting him throughout his career. Therefore, he sought to rebuild Qing'an Shrine, a proposal that was supported by the Directorate General of Highways, local residents, and truck drivers using the road. The new building was named Kailu Xianfengye Temple to match the inscription on the plaque.

== Worship ==
Every year, employees of the fourth construction division in the Directorate General of Highways, along with residents of Su'ao, visit the shrine to pay tribute and pray for safety of people that use the highway.
