= Neipi Beach =

Beach in Su'ao, Yilan County, Taiwan

Neipi Beach 內埤海灘
- beach
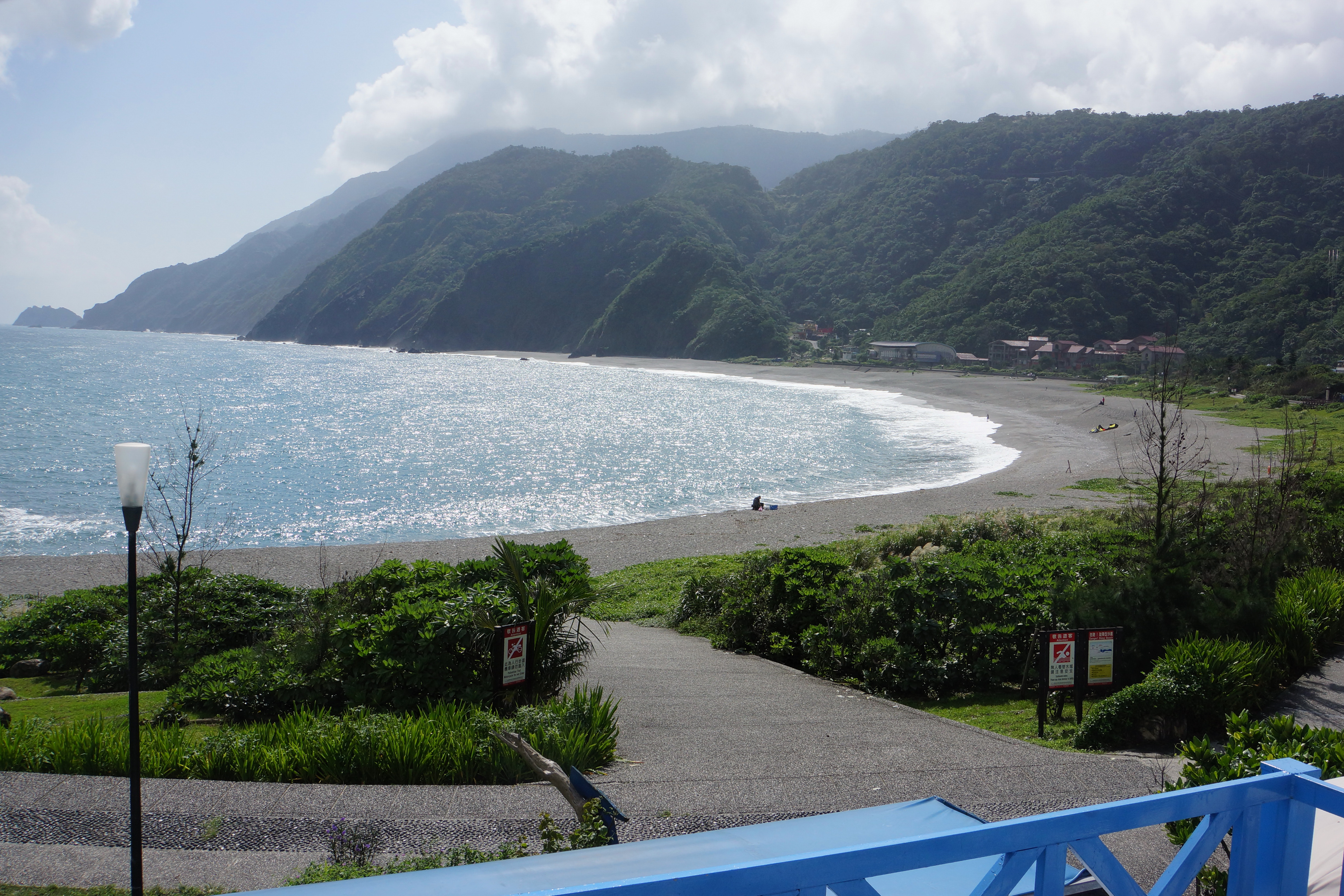

- Taiwan
- Coordinates: 24°34′37.9″N 121°52′14.8″E
- Location: Su'ao, Yilan County, Taiwan
- Access: Su'ao Station

The Neipi Beach (traditional Chinese: 內埤海灘; simplified Chinese: 内埤海滩; pinyin: Nèipí Hǎitān) is a beach in Su'ao Township, Yilan County, Taiwan facing the Pacific Ocean.

== Geology ==
The beach is located at the southern end of the Northeast and Yilan Coast National Scenic Area. It is a place for marine deposit with both fine sands and rubble. It also has marine abrasion land forms such as sea cape, sea cliff and reef at the bottom of the sea. The seabed around this area is uneven, which resulted in the usual undercurrent under the sea. The beach is located at the south of Nanfang'ao Fishing Port and is separated by a large pile of dirt.

== Transportation ==
The beach is accessible south east from Su'ao Station of Taiwan Railway.

== Pictures ==
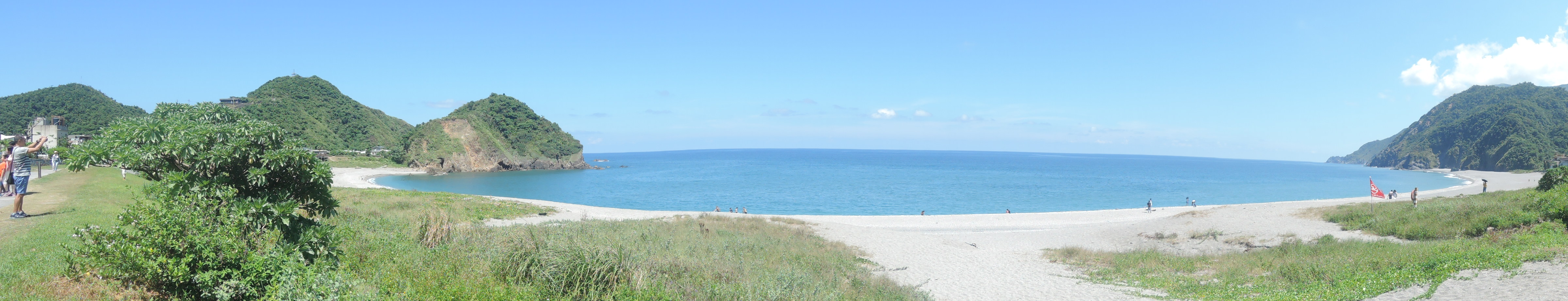

== See also ==
- List of tourist attractions in Taiwan
