= Suhua Highway Improvement Project =

Highway project in northeast Taiwan

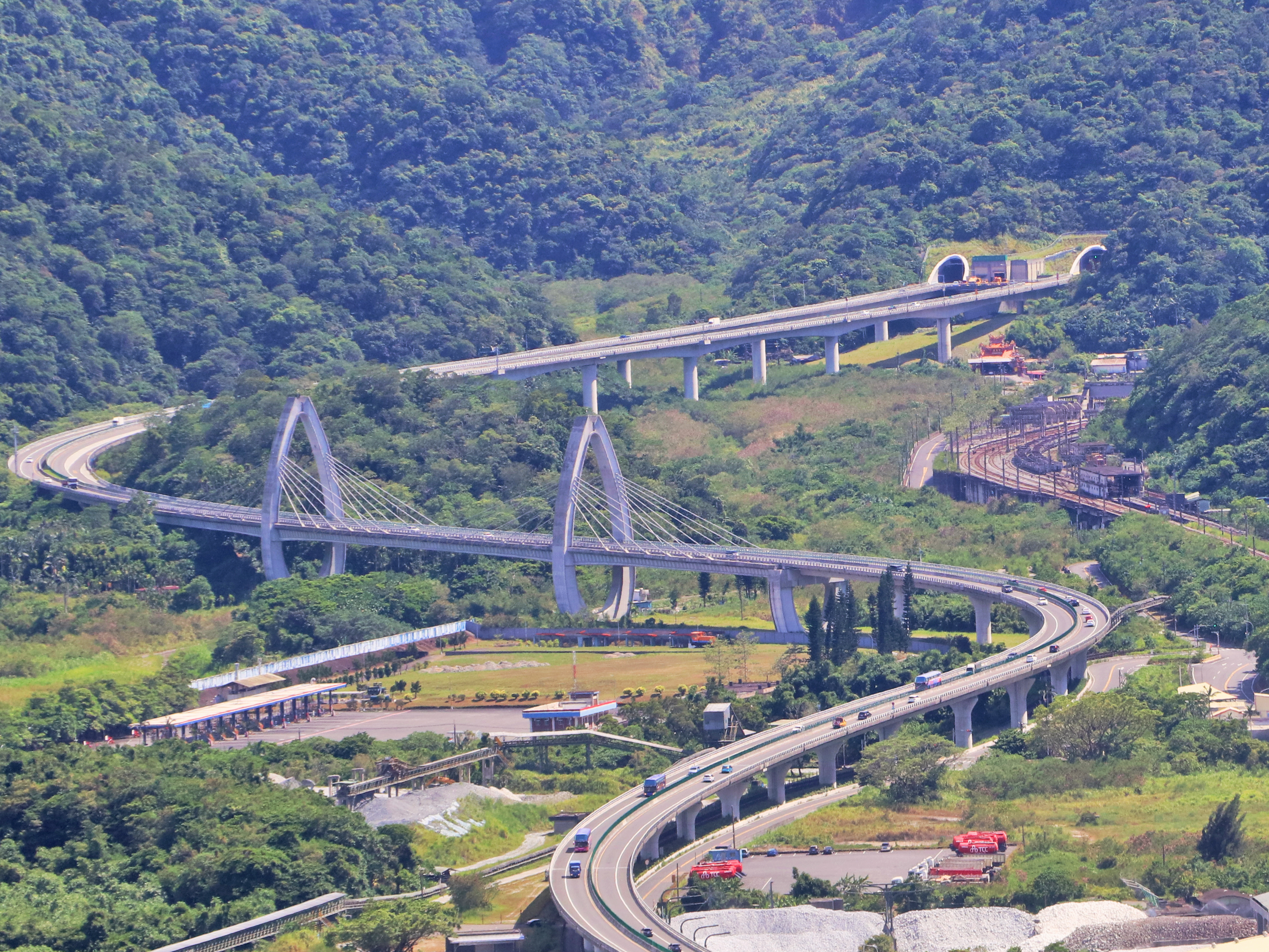
Baimi Bridge, part of the Suhua Highway Improvement Project

The Suhua Highway Improvement Project (Chinese: 蘇花公路改善計畫; pinyin: Sū-Huā Gōnglù Gǎishàn Jìhuà; colloquially 蘇花改, pinyin: Sūhuāgǎi) was a major highway project in northeast Taiwan to improve and bypass dangerous sections of the Suhua Highway, part of Provincial Highway 9.

The Suhua Highway is the main road connecting Su'ao Township and Hualien City. A portion of the original alignment was built alongside very steep cliffs high above the Pacific Ocean. Because of the rugged terrain, it was often closed due to heavy rain, typhoons, or landslides, leading to injuries and deaths.

In the 1990s, the Ministry of Transportation and Communications (MOTC) started planning a new freeway to connect Su'ao and Hualien, as part of National Freeway 5. However, it was controversial because of its environmental impact. Instead, the MOTC developed a scaled-down project, which constructed bridges and tunnels in three dangerous sections: Su'ao–Dong'ao (9.8 km, 6.1 mi), Nan'ao–Heping (20 km, 12 mi), and Heping–Qingshui (8.6 km, 5.3 mi). The improved highway has a speed limit of 60 kilometres per hour (37 mph), lower than a freeway, and still has only one lane in each direction. It cut travel time along the coastline from 2.5 hours to 80 minutes. Some parts of the old alignment was kept open for bicycles and small vehicles, with a speed limit of 30 kilometres per hour (19 mph).

The project was named the Suhua Highway Alternative Project (Chinese: 蘇花公路替代計畫; pinyin: Sū-Huā Gōnglù Tìdài Jìhuà; colloquially 蘇花替 pinyin: Sūhuātì) in 2008. Its name was changed to its current name in 2010.

Construction started in 2011 and was expected to take five years and cost 46.5 billion New Taiwan dollars. Due to difficulties in construction, the project was finally completed in 2020 at a cost of 55.17 billion New Taiwan dollars.
