= Suhua Highway =

118-kilometre section of the Provincial Highway 9 in Taiwan

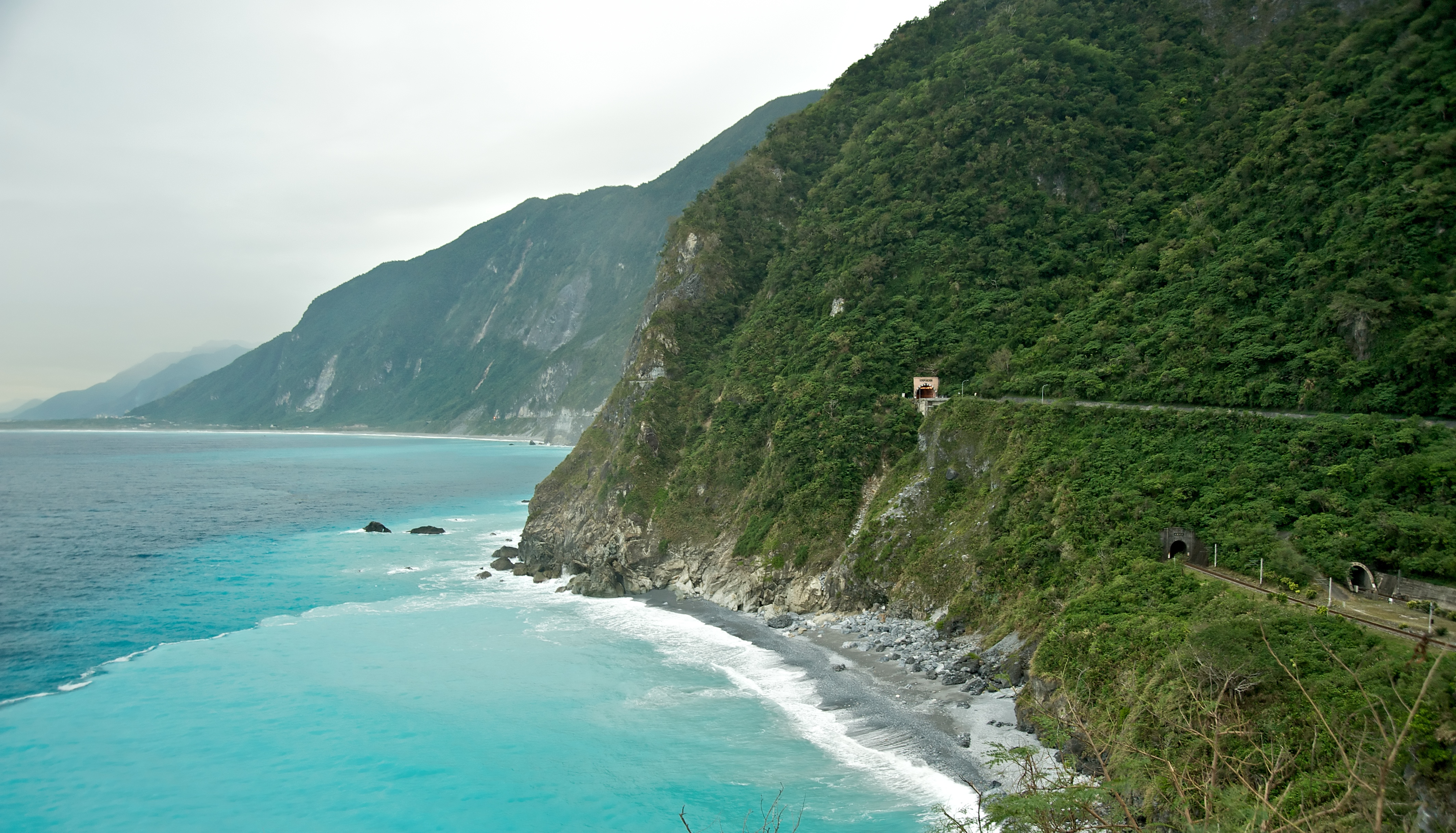
Qingshui Cliffs

Part of the old, abandoned highway through Chongde, Hualien

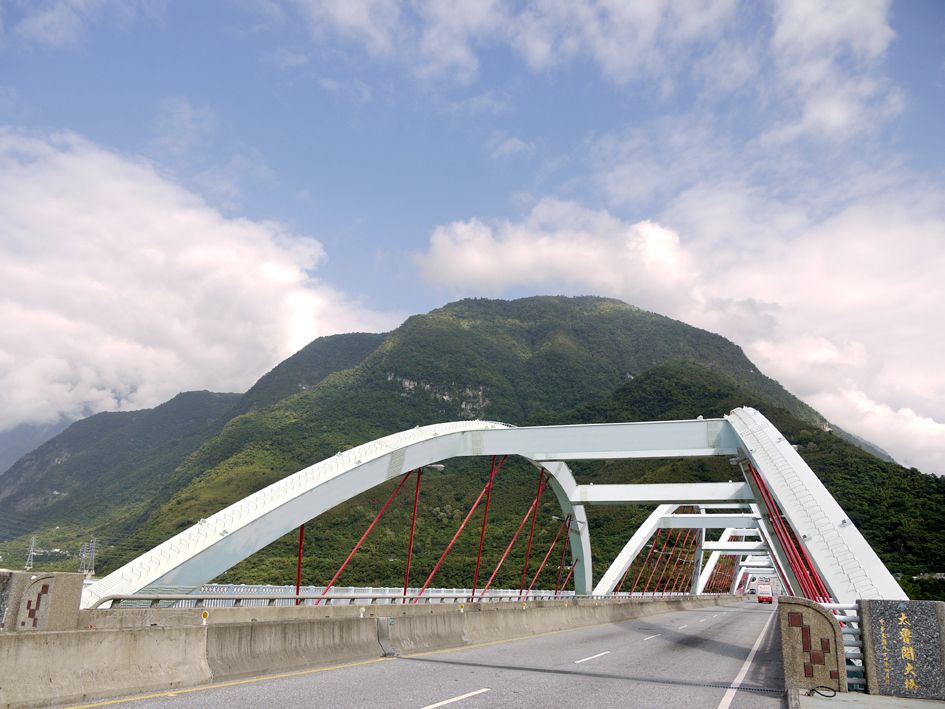
The Taroko Bridge on Suhua Highway

The Suhua Highway (Chinese: 蘇花公路; pinyin: Sū-Huā Gōnglù), also called the Suao-Hualien Highway, is a 118-kilometre (73 mi) section of the Provincial Highway 9 in Taiwan, starting at Su'ao Township, Yilan County and ending at Hualien City, Hualien County. With a portion built alongside very steep cliffs high above the Pacific Ocean, it is considered to be one of Taiwan's most dangerous but also most scenic drives. Famous stops along the way include the Qingshui Cliffs and Taroko Gorge, located at the southern end of the highway.

== History ==
A footpath between Su'ao and Hualien was first built by the Qing Dynasty government between 1874 and 1876, as part of a program to assert its sovereignty over eastern Taiwan – hitherto inhabited mostly by Taiwanese aborigines – after the Taiwan Expedition of 1874 by Japan. The narrowness of the footpath, dictated by the extreme cliffside topography, meant that its military value far outweighed its economic benefit, and it was subsequently abandoned and rebuilt several times. Eventually it was widened by the Japanese colonial government; with nine bridges built, 14 tunnels constructed, and road surface covered with gravel, the highway was opened to vehicular traffic in May 1932.

Nonetheless, the northern portion of the highway, between Su-ao and Taroko, was just 3.56 metres (11.7 ft) in width, permitting only one-way traffic at a time. Vehicles were required to travel in convoys, controlled by six turnouts along the route. With no guard rails to speak of and falling rocks a constant threat, the cliffside Suhua Highway was regarded as one of the most dangerous in the world. Nonetheless, it remained the main transport link between eastern and northern Taiwan, until the completion of the North-Link Line railway in 1980. In the 1980s the northern portion of the highway was widened again to facilitate two-way traffic; construction was completed in 1990.

Calls for improvements of the dangerous highway gained urgency in 2010 after over 20 people traveling along the road were killed by landslides caused by Typhoon Megi. The Suhua Highway Improvement Project, which was completed in 2020, bypassed three sections of the highway that were vulnerable to landslides.

== Memorials ==
Along the highway, there are many memorials dedicated to those that lost their lives on the highway. Kailu Xianfengye Temple, located between Su'ao and Dong'ao, is dedicated to thirteen construction workers that perished.

== See also ==
- Highway system in Taiwan
- List of traffic collisions (2010–present)#2010
- Suhua Highway Improvement Project
