= Maling Temple =

Temple in Houlong, Miaoli, Taiwan

- 媽靈宮
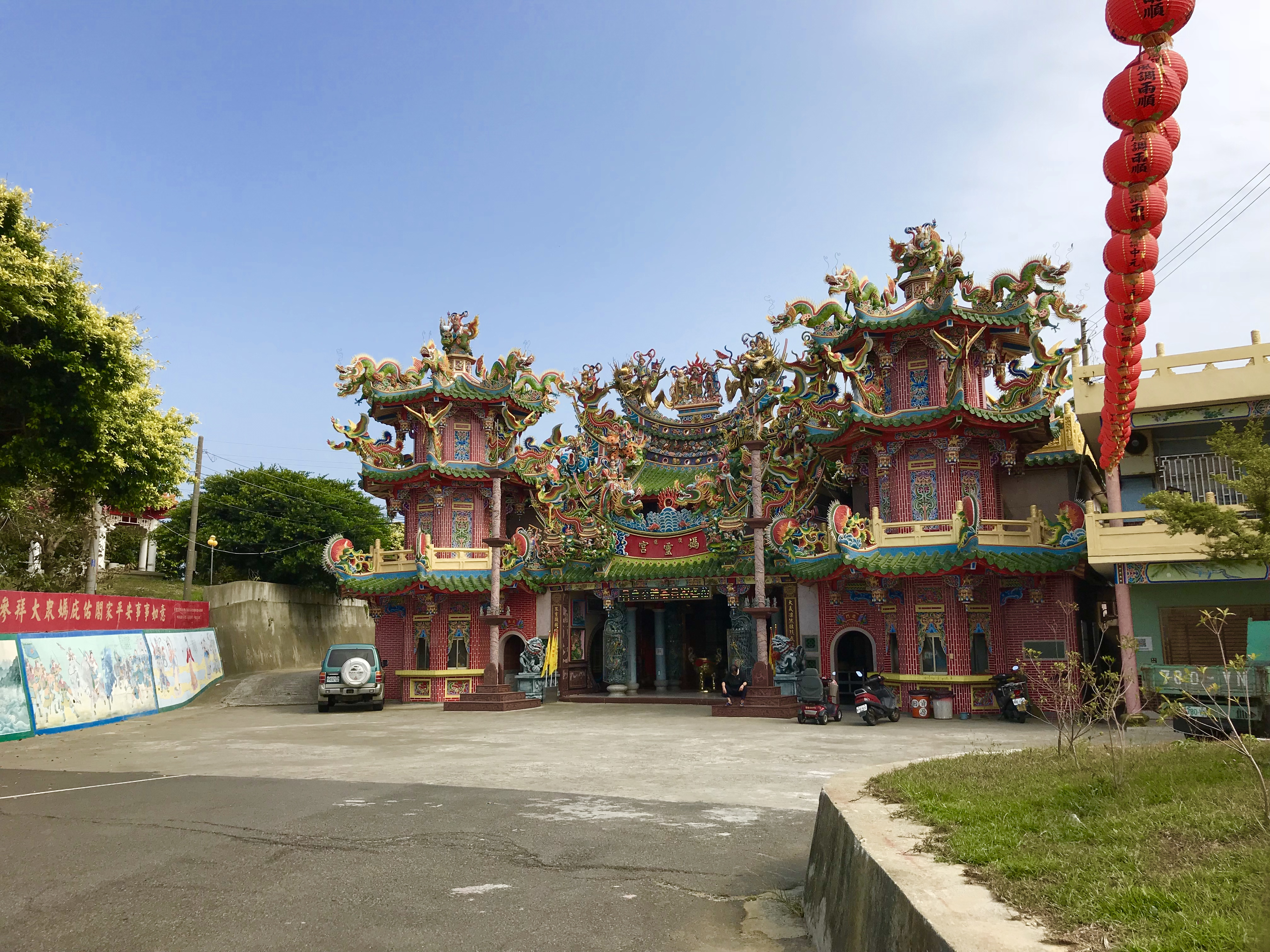

Religion
- Affiliation: Chinese folk religion, Taoism
- Deity: Wang Baoying

Location
- Location: Houlong, Miaoli County
- Country: Taiwan
- Interactive map of Maling Temple
- Coordinates: 24.5873°N 120.7256°E

Architecture
- Completed: 1930
- Direction of façade: Southwest

Maling Temple (Chinese: 媽靈宮; pinyin: Mālíng Gōng) is a temple located in the village of Chituqi, Houlong Township, Miaoli County, Taiwan.

== Origin ==
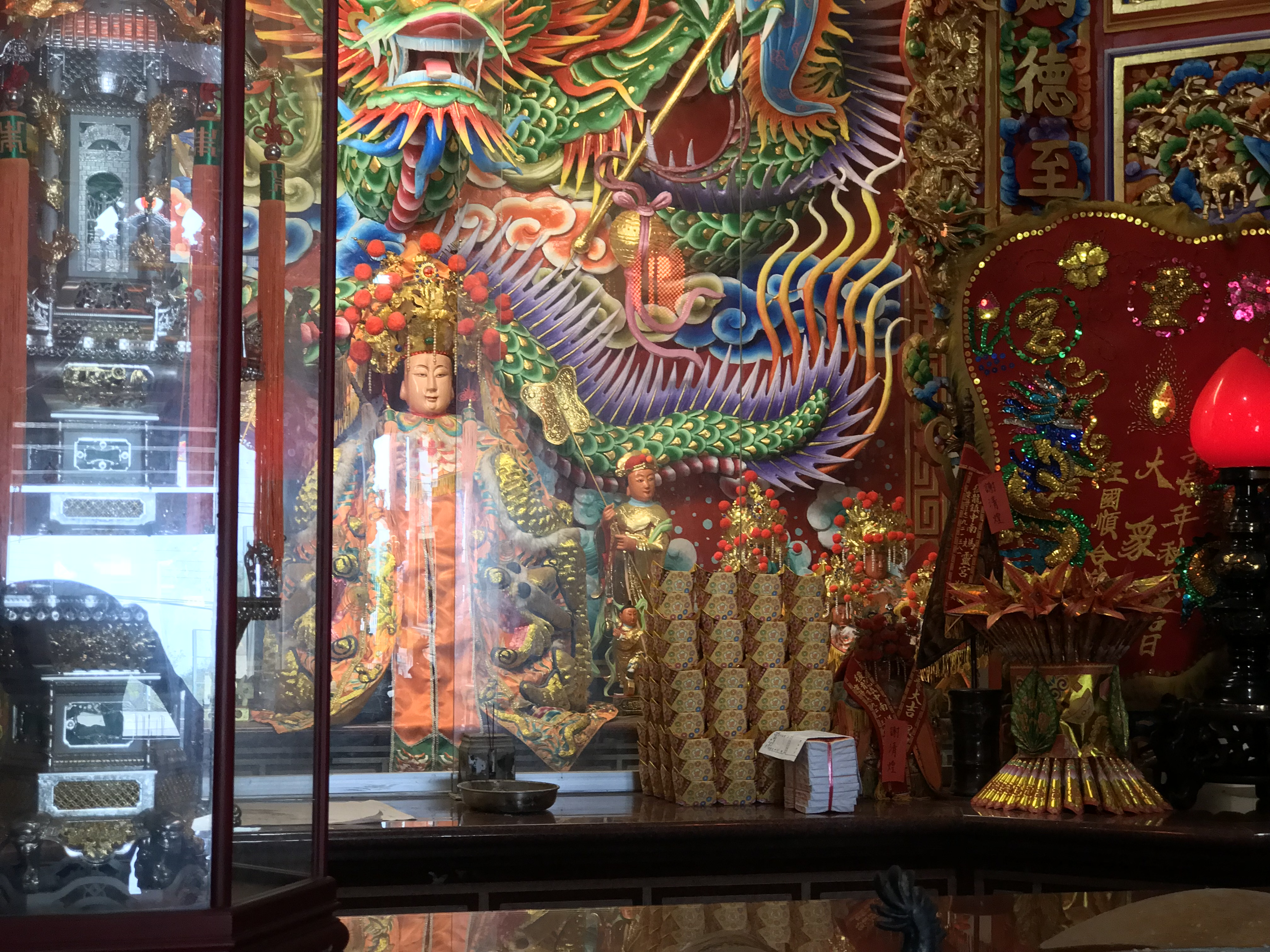
Wang Baoying's statue within the main hall.

Chituqi is located on top of a plateau near the coast along the Taiwan Strait. Historically, the area was mostly uninhabited and undeveloped for its remoteness and superstitions surrounding an unmarked mass grave there. In 1930, a yin miao (temple for ghosts) named "Wanshan Temple" (萬善祠) was constructed near the remains. According to legend, a pair of ghosts, one male and one female, dwelled in the area that would lead the way for lost travelers. Merchants claimed that every time the pair appeared, their business for the day would be good. Fishermen also claimed that a fireball would shoot up from the temple whenever the ocean's conditions were dangerous the next day. Therefore, The pair of ghosts were seen as deities, and in the 1960s, it was rebuilt and dedicated to the ghosts.

According to temple officials, the female ghost was named Wang Baoying (王寶英), and is believed to be a consort to Qianlong Emperor in the Qing Dynasty. Supposedly, Wang led an army in 1741 to quash a pro-Ming rebel's forces in Taiwan. When they landed in Tamsui, Wang befriended Liu Xuanxiang (劉玄祥), who served as her lead. However, the entire army was annihilated in Chitugi in an ambush. Wang and Liu are known as Dazhongma (大眾媽) and Dazhongye (大眾爺), respectively. The bones from the mass grave are now stored in the temple.

== Worship ==
Every lunar year one day after Lantern Festival, Maling Temple celebrates the birthday of Wang Baoying. The temple places a wide variety of offerings on top of a camphor wood turtle plate, a tradition stemming from red tortoise cakes. The offerings are different every year based on the wishes of Wang Baoying.

== Chiang Kai-shek memorial ==
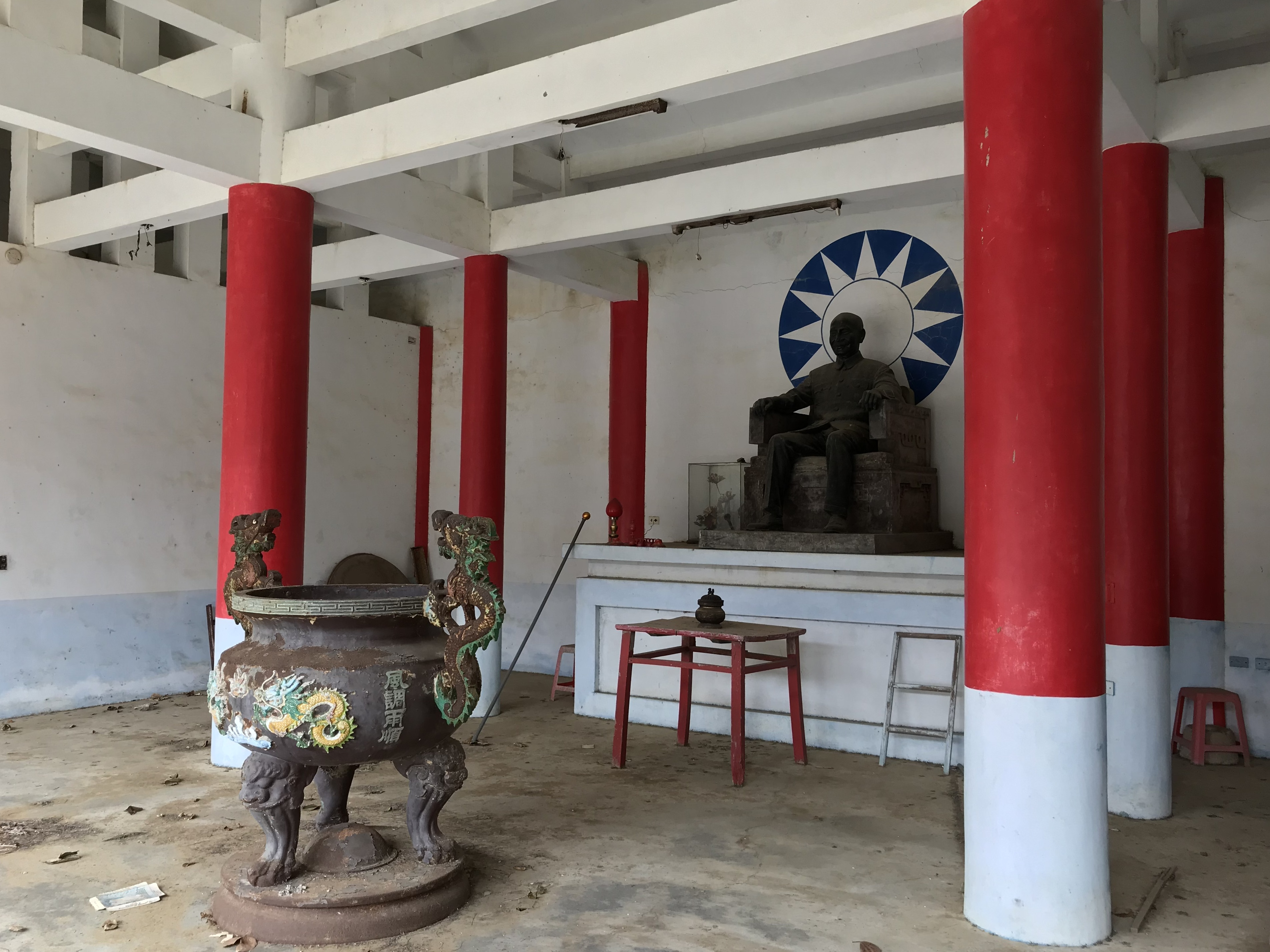
The interior or the Chaing Kai-shek shrine.

Directly adjacent to Maling Temple, there is a shrine dedicated to Chiang Kai-shek and the City God. The shrine was built near Chiang's death by a nearby resident with the surname Ho, who upon the shrine's completion lived in it. When Ho died, his descendants donated the shrine to Maling Temple.
