= Su'ao Cold Spring =

Cold spring in Su'ao, Yilan County, Taiwan

- 蘇澳冷泉
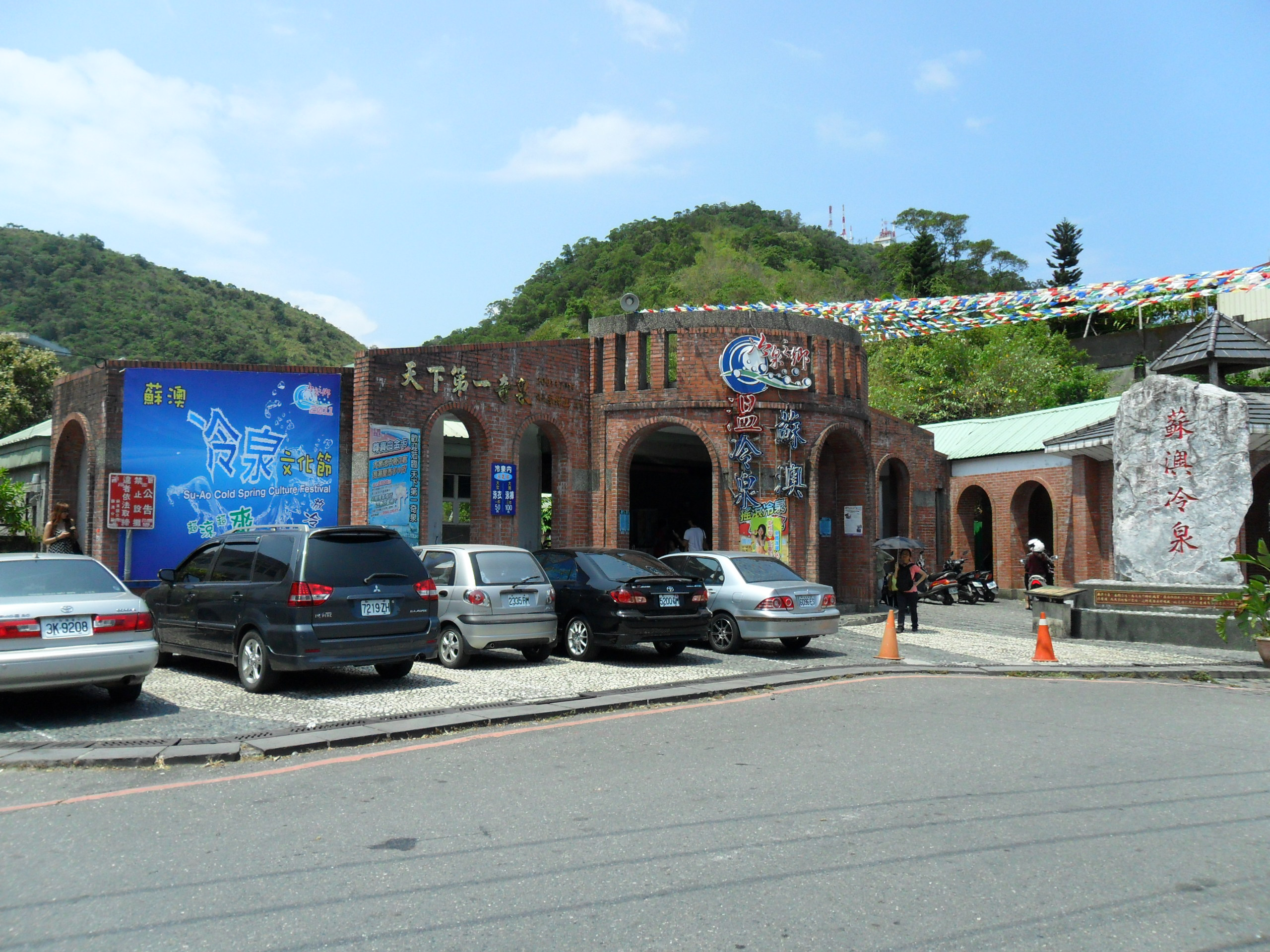
- Interactive map of Su'ao Cold Spring
- Location: Su'ao, Yilan County, Taiwan
- Coordinates: 24.596731°N 121.850984°E
- Type: cold spring
- Temperature: 22 °C (72 °F)

Su'ao Cold Spring (Chinese: 蘇澳冷泉; pinyin: Sū'ào Lěngquán) is a cold spring in Su'ao Township, Yilan County, Taiwan.

== History ==
The cold spring was discovered by the Japanese army in 1928.

== Geology ==
Su'ao Cold Spring has a spring water temperature of 22 °C. It is both batheable and drinkable, and it has a pH of 5.5. According to Japanese researchers, the cold spring contains carbonic ion concentrations of 68ppm, the highest of all springs in Taiwan. Its sodium ion concentrations were 14.3ppm and calcium ion 10.7ppm. Su'ao Cold Spring is the only calcium hydroxy carbonic spring in Taiwan.

Su'ao Cold Spring contains a generous volume of carbon dioxide, which was in the past used to produce Ramune (Natural soda water).

== Transportation ==
- Train: Taiwan Railway Yilan line to Su'ao Station is approximately 300m.
- Highway: Tai 2 from Taipei, Tai 9 both south from Hualien City, north from Taipei.
- Freeway: Freeway number 5

== See also ==
- List of tourist attractions in Taiwan
- Taiwanese hot springs
