= Coral Museum =

Museum in Su'ao, Yilan County, Taiwan

- 珊瑚法界博物館
- Location: Su'ao, Yilan County, Taiwan
- Coordinates: 24°34′57″N 121°51′51″E
- Type: museum

The Coral Museum (traditional Chinese: 珊瑚法界博物館; simplified Chinese: 珊瑚法界博物馆; pinyin: Shānhú Fǎjiè Bówùguǎn) is a museum in Su'ao Township, Yilan County, Taiwan.

== Architecture ==
The museum is housed in a 3-story building. The ground floor consists of a café and a gift shop, the upper floor displays the culture, ecology and types of corals and the top most floor displays the art of corals.

== Transportation ==
The museum is accessible by bus from Su'aoxin Station of the Taiwan Railway.

== See also ==
- List of museums in Taiwan
