= Suao Township =

Urban township in Yilan County, Taiwan

Suao Township 蘇澳鎭 Suō, Su'ao, Su-ao
- Urban township
- Nanfang'ao Fishing Port in Suao Township

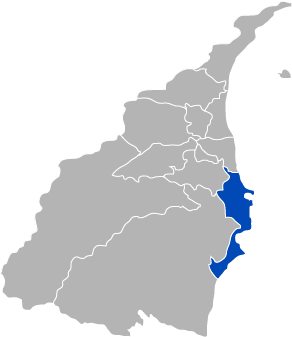
- Location of Suao in Yilan
- Coordinates: 24°35′46″N 121°51′04″E
- Country: Taiwan
- County: Yilan

Area
  - Total: 89.01 km^{2} (34.37 sq mi)

Population (September 2023)
  - Total: 37,602
- Time zone: UTC+8 (Chungyuan Standard Time Zone)
- Postal code: 270
- Website: www.suao.gov.tw (in Chinese)

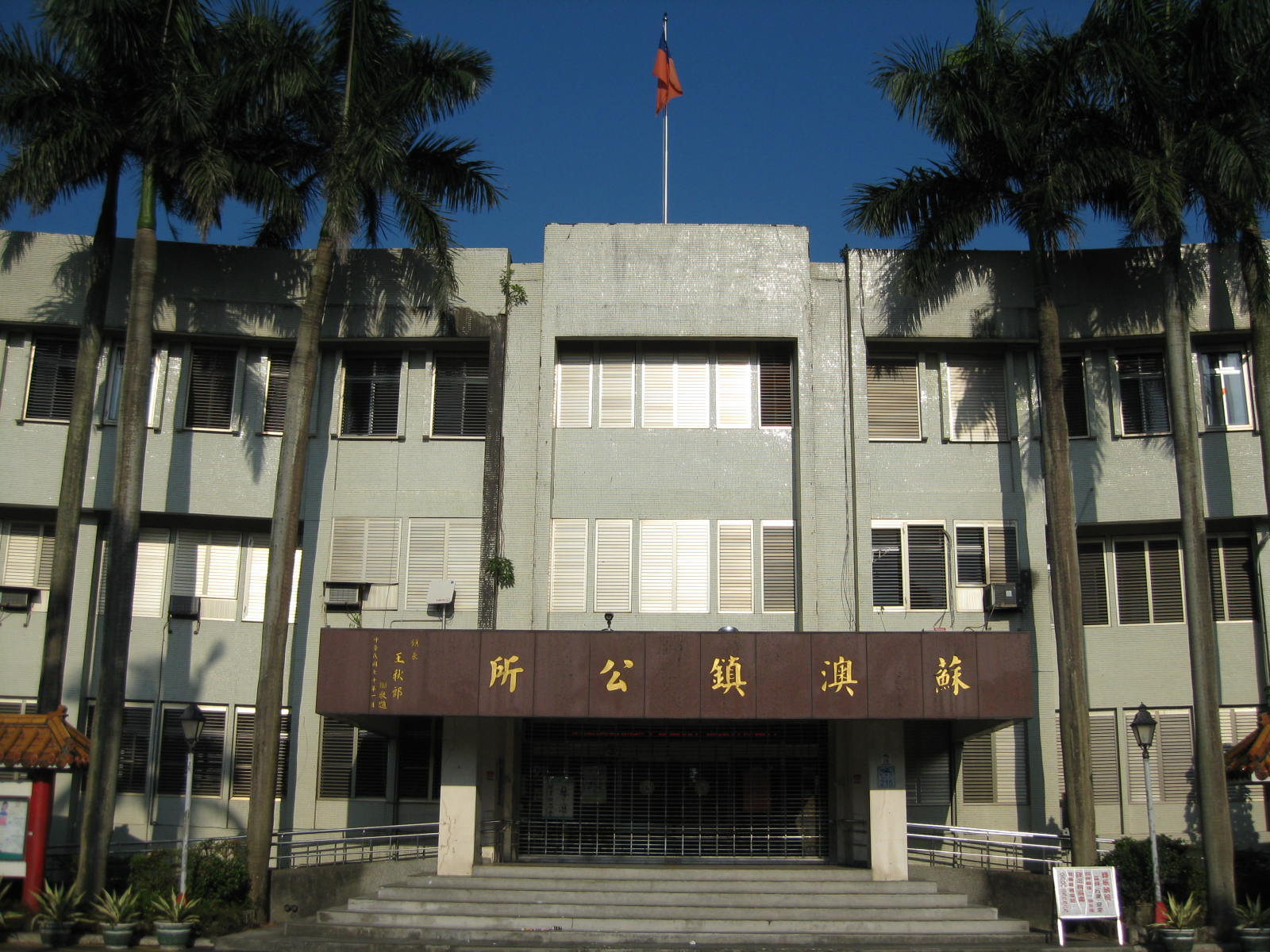
Suao Township office

Suao Township (Chinese: 蘇澳鎭; pinyin: Sū'ào Zhèn; Wade–Giles: Su^{1}-ao^{4} Chen^{4}; Pe̍h-ōe-jī: So͘-ò), alternately romanized as Su-ao or Su'ao, is located in southern Yilan County, Taiwan, is an urban township that is famous for its seafood restaurants and cold springs. It is a terminus of National Highway No. 5, the Suao-Hualien Express Way, and the North-Link Line of Taiwan Railway. It also has two large harbors: Suao Port, a seaport that also houses a naval base, and Nanfang-ao Port, a major fishing port of Taiwan.

== History ==
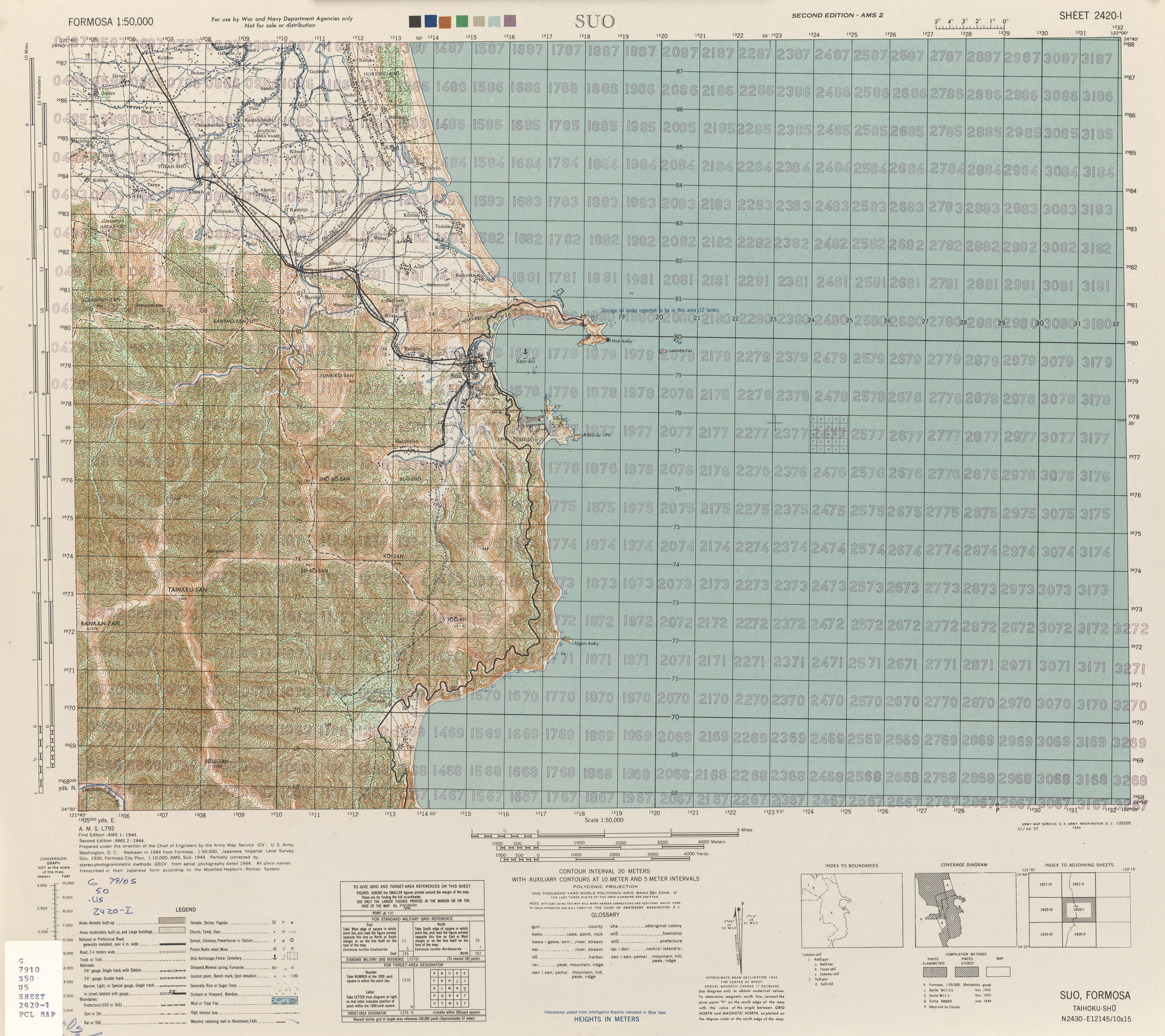
Map of Suao (labeled as Suō) and surrounding area (1944)

During Japanese rule, the area was established as Suō Town (蘇澳街), Suō District, Taihoku Prefecture. After World War II, the town was converted to a township under Taipei County. In 1950, the township was put under the newly established Yilan County.

== Demographics ==
As of September 2023, Suao had 14,533 households and a total population of 37,602, including 18,520 females and 19,082 males. The population of Suao Town has been decreasing on average since 1981.

== Villages ==
The township comprises 26 villages: Aiding, Cunren, Dingliao, Gangbian, Longde, Nanan, Nancheng, Nanjian, Nanning, Nanqiang, Nanxing, Nanzheng, Shengai, Shenghu, Subei, Sunan, Sutung, Suxi, Tungao, Xincheng, Yongchun, Yongguang, Yongle, Yongrong, Zhangan and Zhaoyang.

== Tourist attractions ==
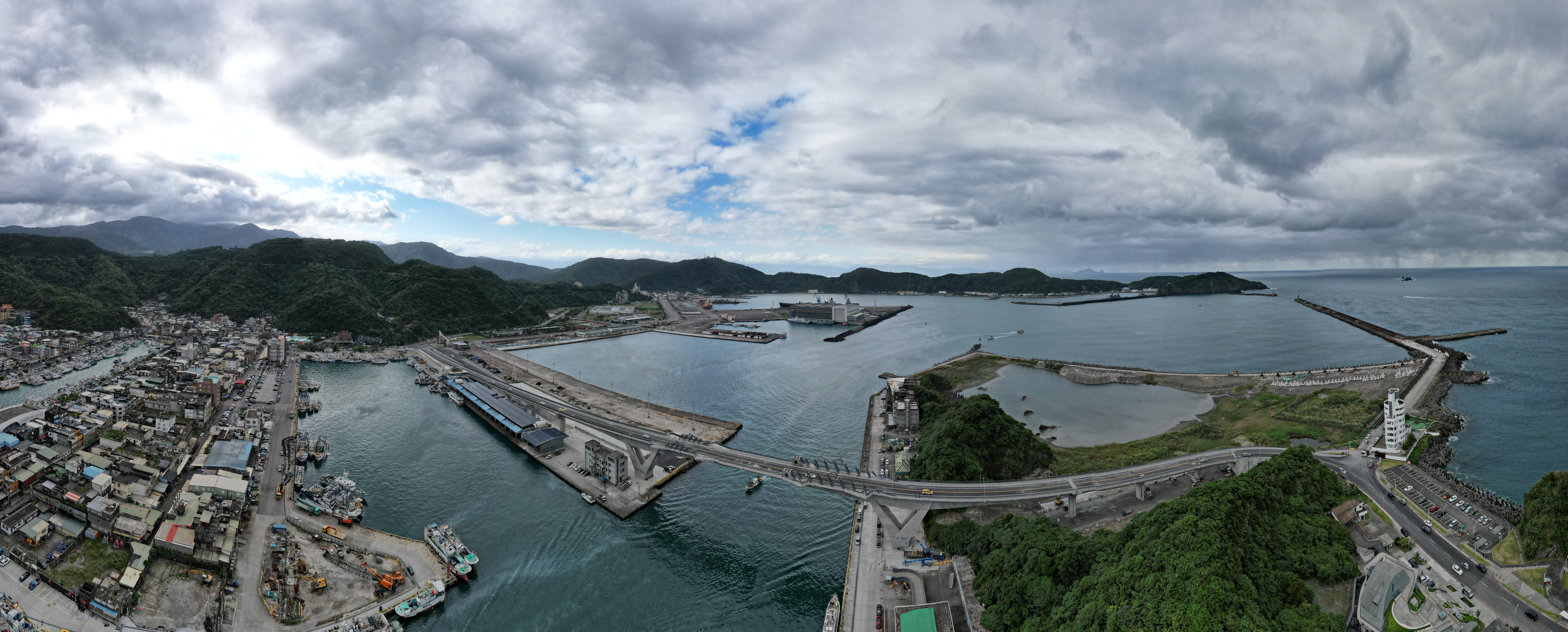
Suao's Nanfangao Aerial Panorama. Shot December 2022

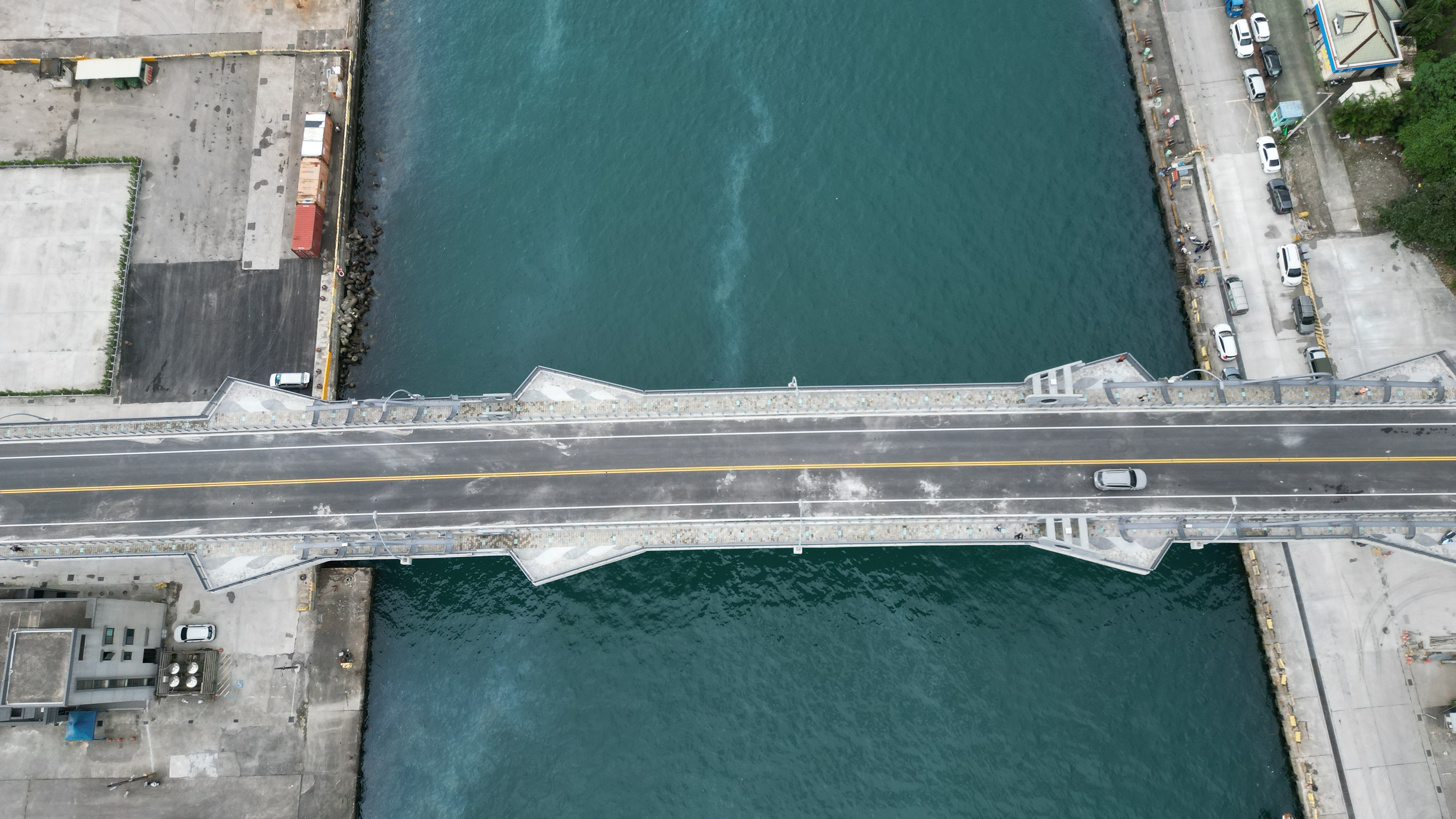
Suao's Nanfangao Bridge. Shot December 2022.

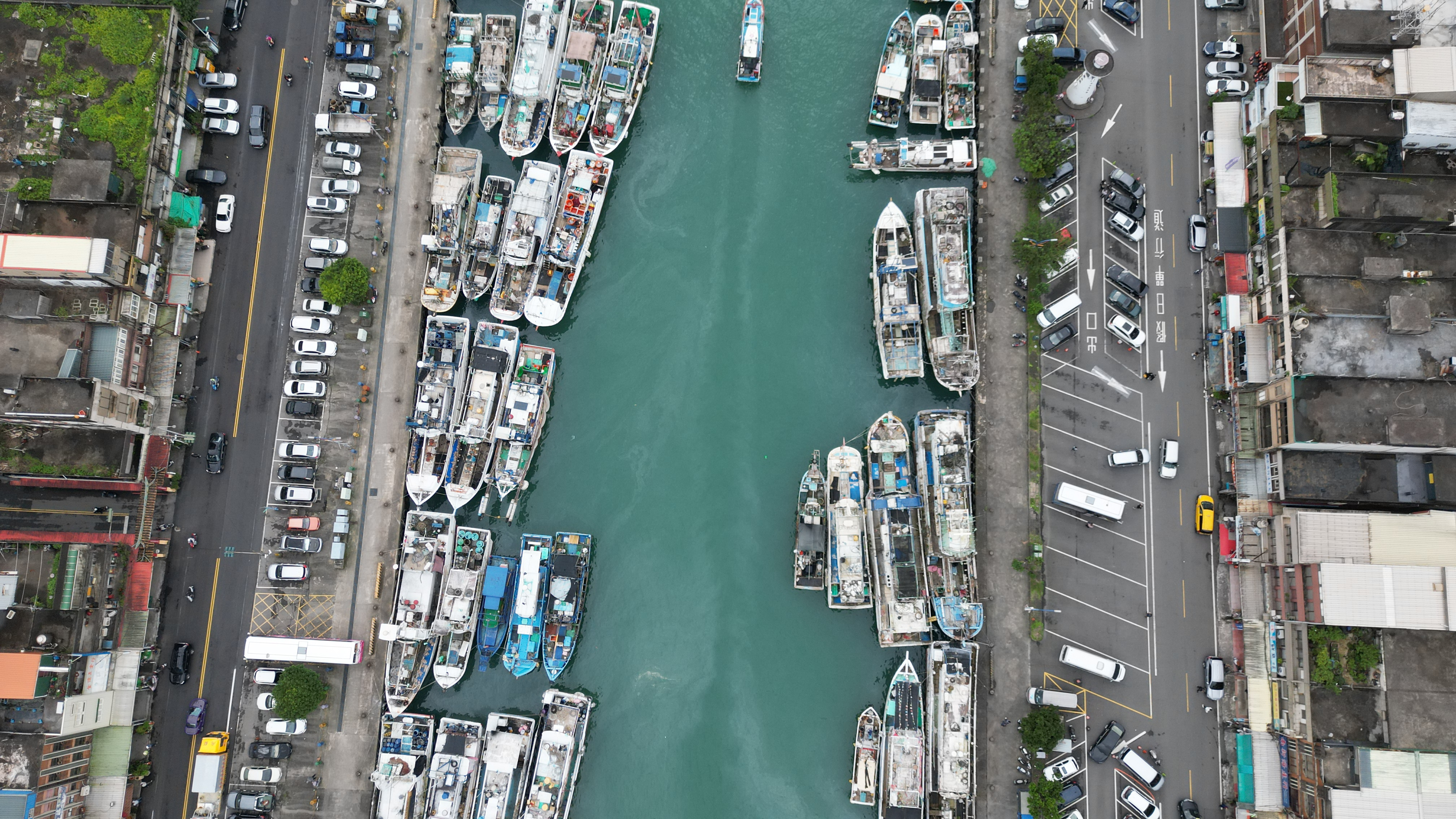
Suao's Nanfangao Port from above. Shot December 2022.

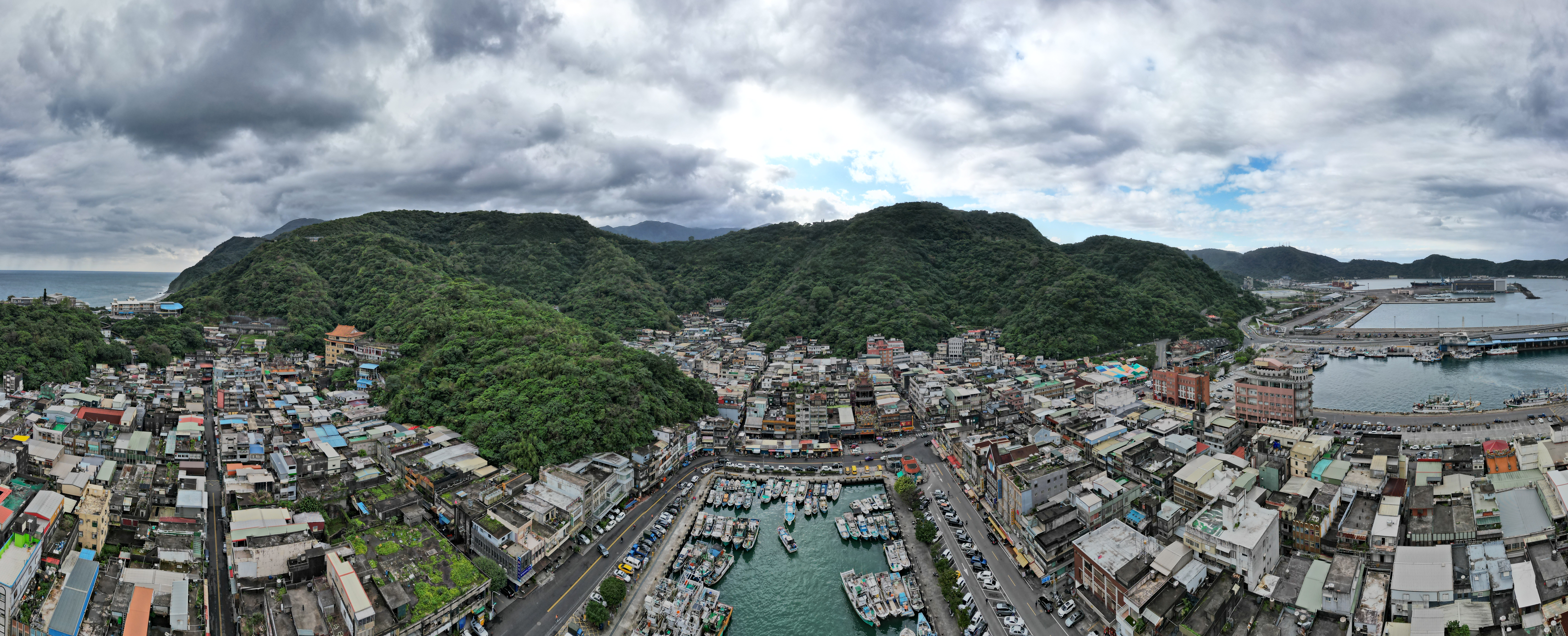
Suao's Nanfangao Nantian Temple from above. Shot December 2022.

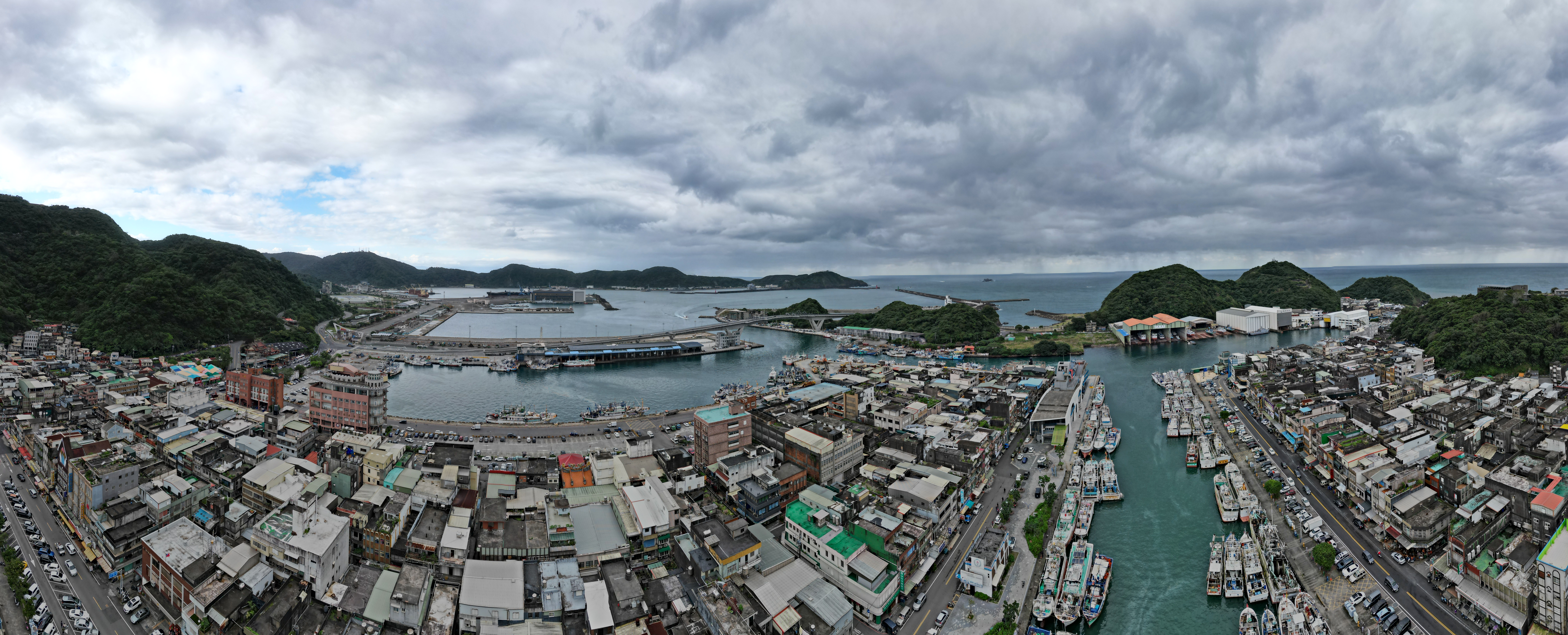
Suao's Nanfangao Port aerial panorama. Shot December 2022.

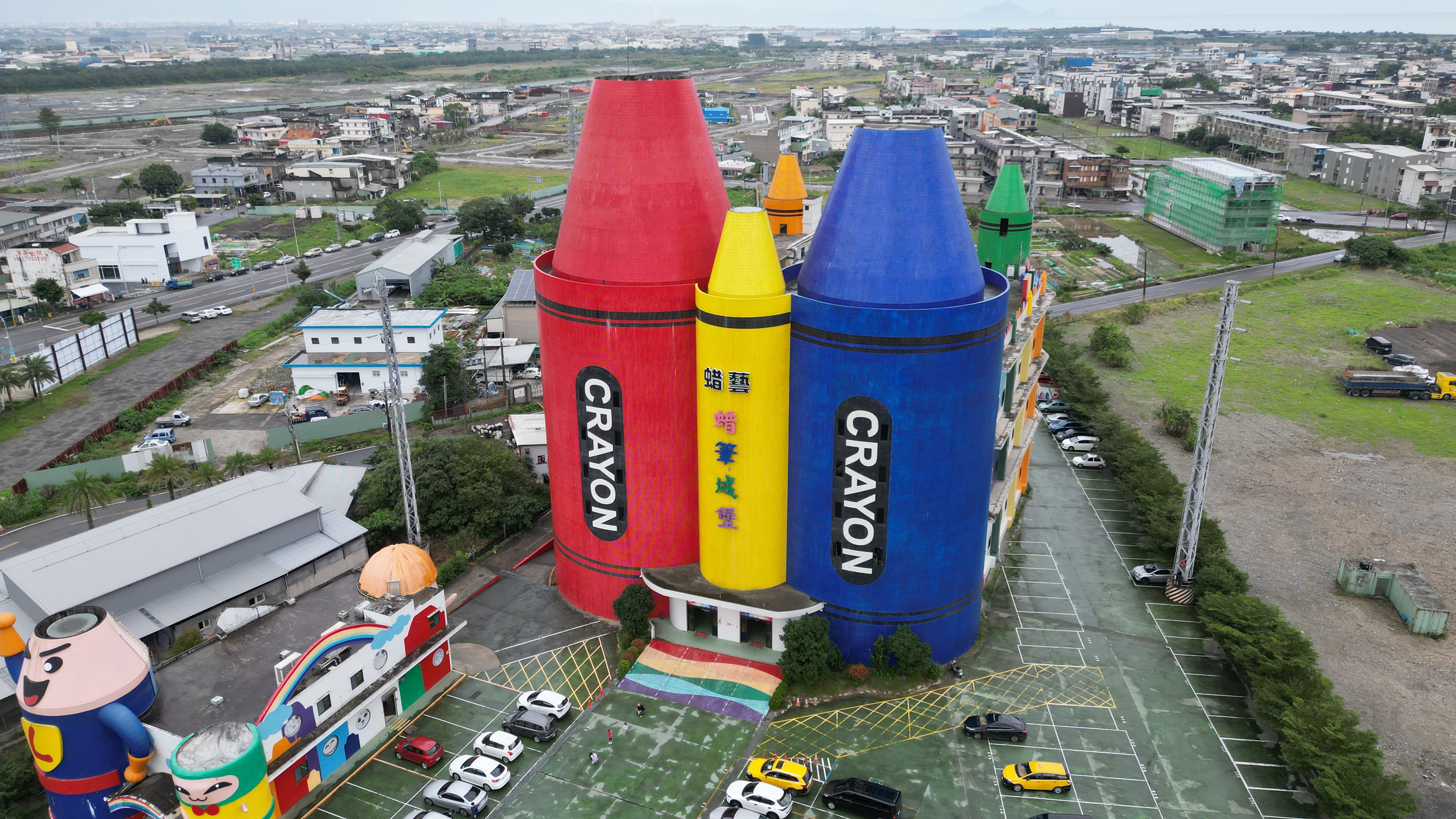
Suao's Lucky Art Crayon Factory from above. Shot December 2022.

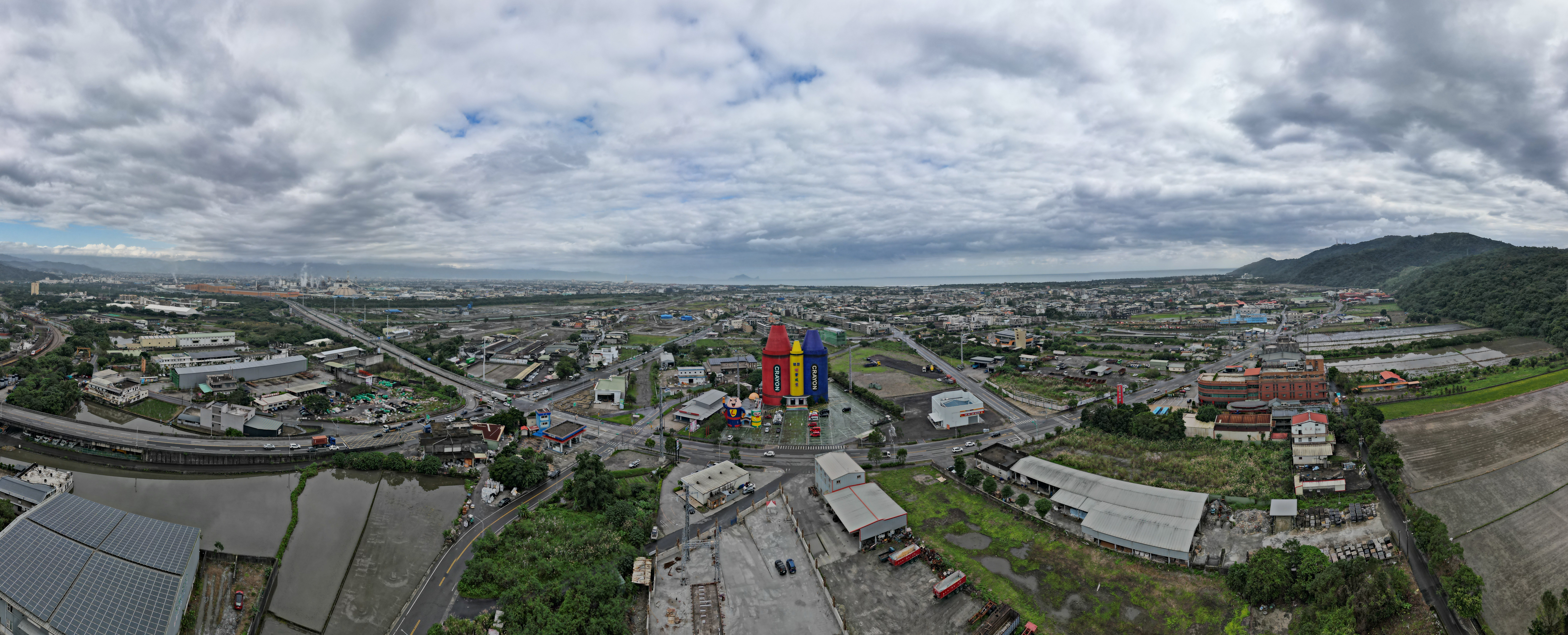
Suao's Lucky Art Crayon Factory panorama. Shot December 2022.

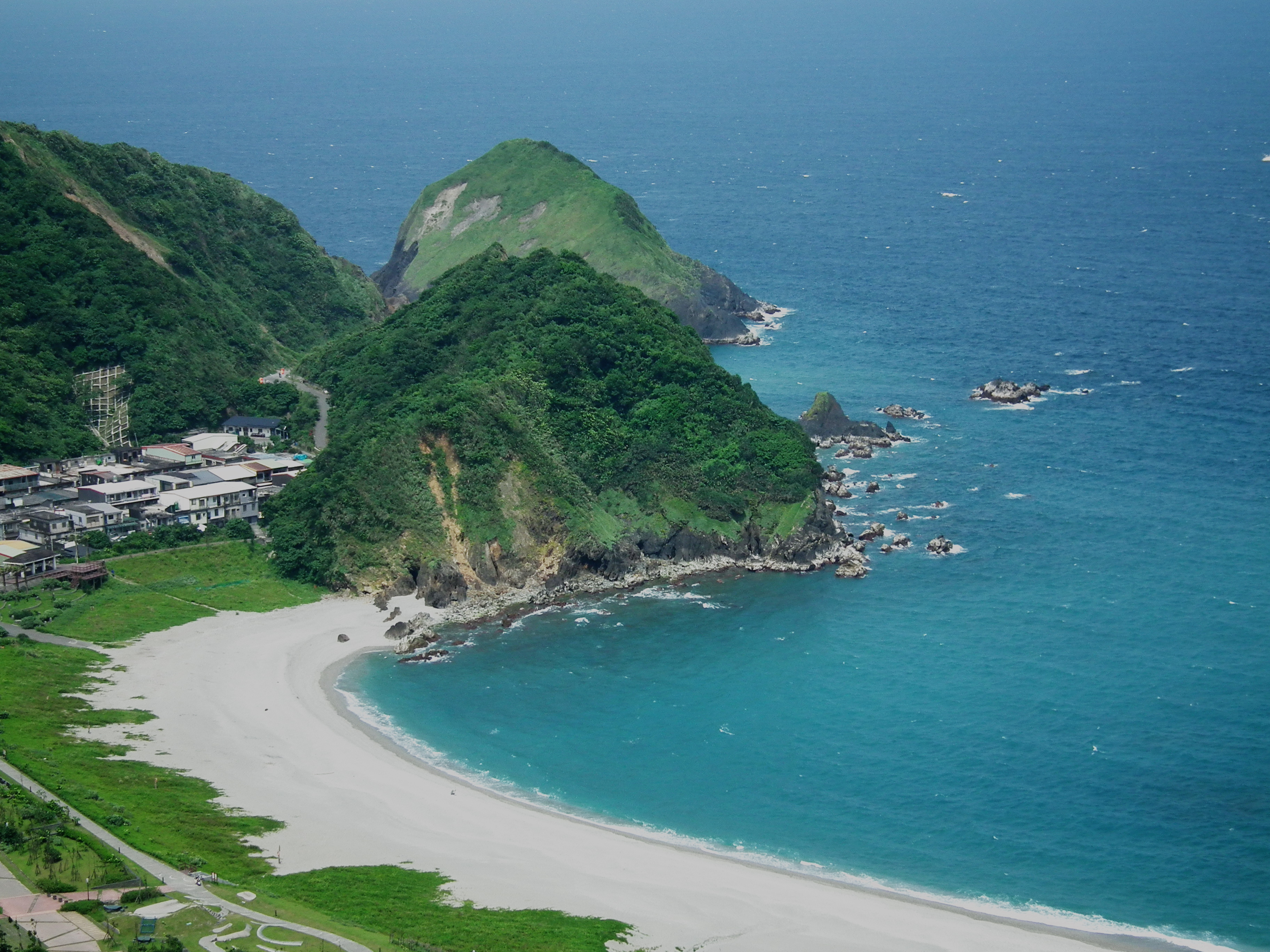
Neipi Beach

- Nantian Temple
- Kailu Xianfengye Temple
- Baitul Muslimin Mosque
- Coral Museum
- Nanfang'ao Fishing Port
- Neipi Beach
- Su'ao Cold Spring
- Su'ao Fortress
- Taxi Museum
- Tofu Cape
- Wulaokeng Scenic Area
- Zhu Dayu Culture Museum

== Climate ==
Suao has a humid subtropical climate (Köppen Classification Cfa).

Climate data for Suao (1991–2020 normals, extremes 1982–present）
Month	Jan	Feb	Mar	Apr	May	Jun	Jul	Aug	Sep	Oct	Nov	Dec	Year
Record high °C (°F)	27.8 (82.0)	28.4 (83.1)	30.6 (87.1)	31.9 (89.4)	33.7 (92.7)	34.7 (94.5)	36.3 (97.3)	35.8 (96.4)	34.9 (94.8)	32.3 (90.1)	31.0 (87.8)	29.2 (84.6)	36.3 (97.3)
Mean daily maximum °C (°F)	19.3 (66.7)	19.9 (67.8)	22.0 (71.6)	24.9 (76.8)	27.6 (81.7)	30.4 (86.7)	31.8 (89.2)	31.5 (88.7)	29.7 (85.5)	26.5 (79.7)	23.8 (74.8)	20.6 (69.1)	25.7 (78.2)
Daily mean °C (°F)	16.6 (61.9)	17.2 (63.0)	19.0 (66.2)	21.8 (71.2)	24.6 (76.3)	27.3 (81.1)	28.8 (83.8)	28.5 (83.3)	26.8 (80.2)	24.0 (75.2)	21.2 (70.2)	18.0 (64.4)	22.8 (73.1)
Mean daily minimum °C (°F)	14.3 (57.7)	14.7 (58.5)	16.3 (61.3)	19.1 (66.4)	22.0 (71.6)	24.6 (76.3)	26.0 (78.8)	25.7 (78.3)	24.3 (75.7)	21.8 (71.2)	19.0 (66.2)	15.8 (60.4)	20.3 (68.5)
Record low °C (°F)	5.0 (41.0)	7.2 (45.0)	5.8 (42.4)	10.7 (51.3)	14.8 (58.6)	18.1 (64.6)	22.4 (72.3)	22.1 (71.8)	17.4 (63.3)	16.1 (61.0)	10.1 (50.2)	6.3 (43.3)	5.0 (41.0)
Average precipitation mm (inches)	378.6 (14.91)	293.7 (11.56)	193.6 (7.62)	184.3 (7.26)	266.6 (10.50)	229.9 (9.05)	165.8 (6.53)	268.5 (10.57)	450.1 (17.72)	714.1 (28.11)	705.7 (27.78)	584.3 (23.00)	4,435.2 (174.61)
Average precipitation days (≥ 0.1 mm)	20.1	19.2	18.4	16.8	19.3	14.7	9.5	11.5	16.1	20.3	20.7	21.5	208.1
Average relative humidity (%)	79.7	80.8	79.5	80.3	81.8	80.8	76.2	77.3	78.0	79.3	82.2	80.6	79.7
Mean monthly sunshine hours	60.2	63.6	86.9	96.0	116.6	164.3	247.6	222.1	153.7	93.6	69.8	55.8	1,430.2
Source: Central Weather Bureau

== Transportation ==
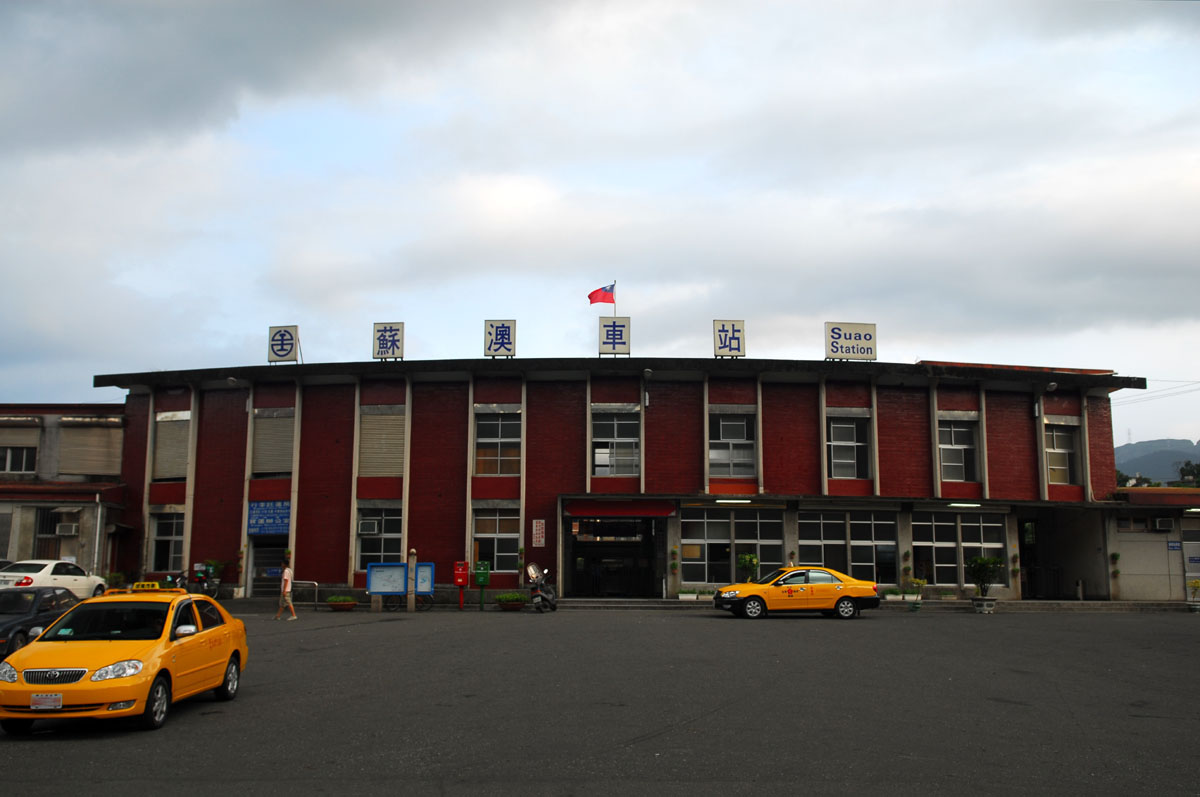
Su'ao Station

- TR Nan'ao Station
- TR Su'ao Station
- TR Su'aoxin Station
- TR Xinma Station
- TR Yongle Station
- Port of Su'ao

== Sister cities ==
- Tateyama, Japan, sister city since 2025

== Notable people ==
- Chang Chen-yue, singer
- Cheng Jei-cheng, Minister of Education (2008-2009)
- Chang Yung-fa, founder of Evergreen Group

== Gallery ==
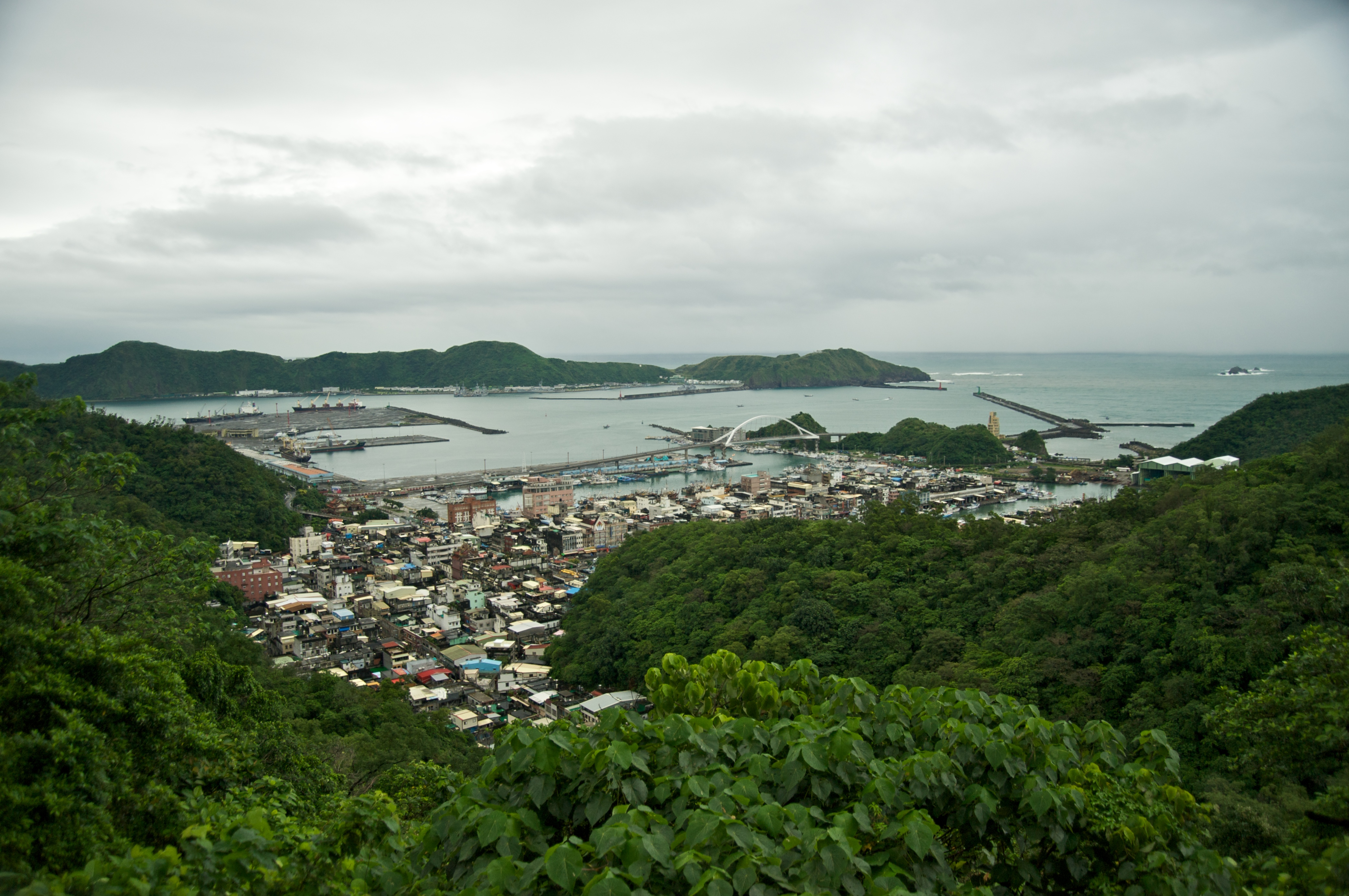
View of the Port of Suao

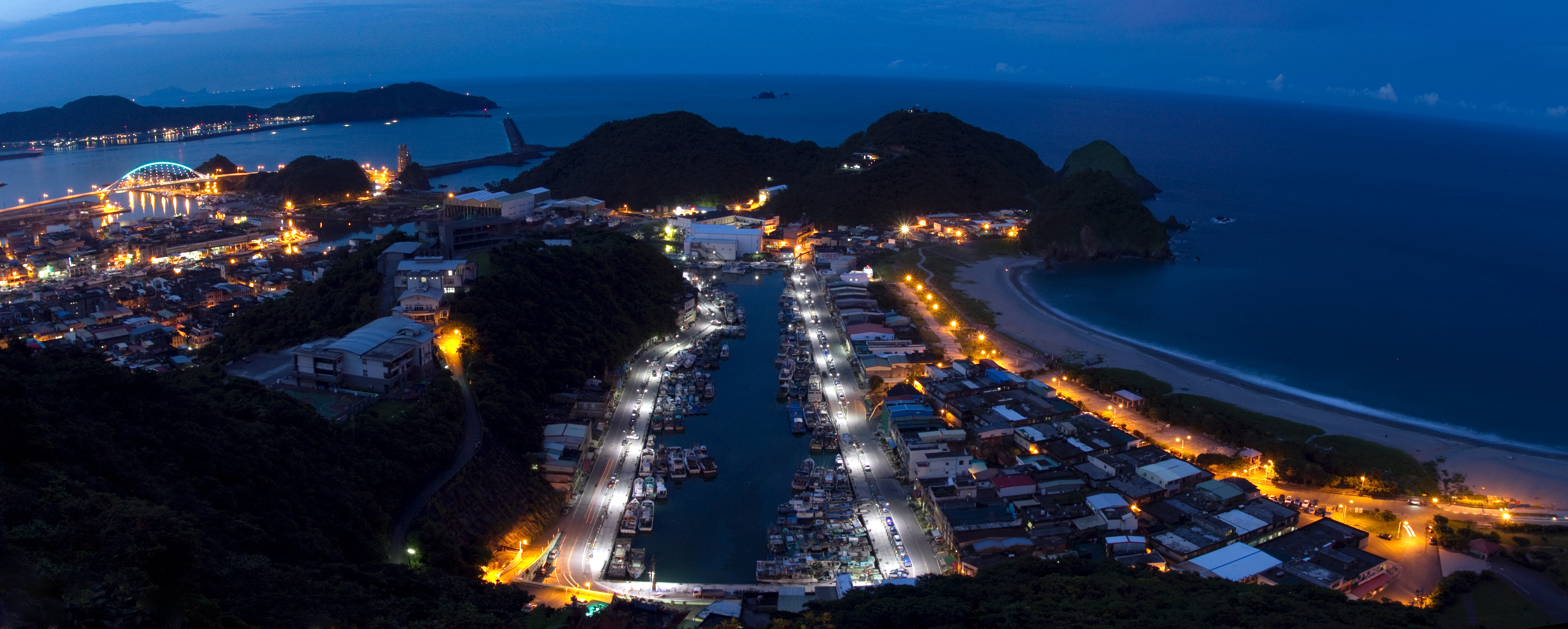
Port of Suao at night

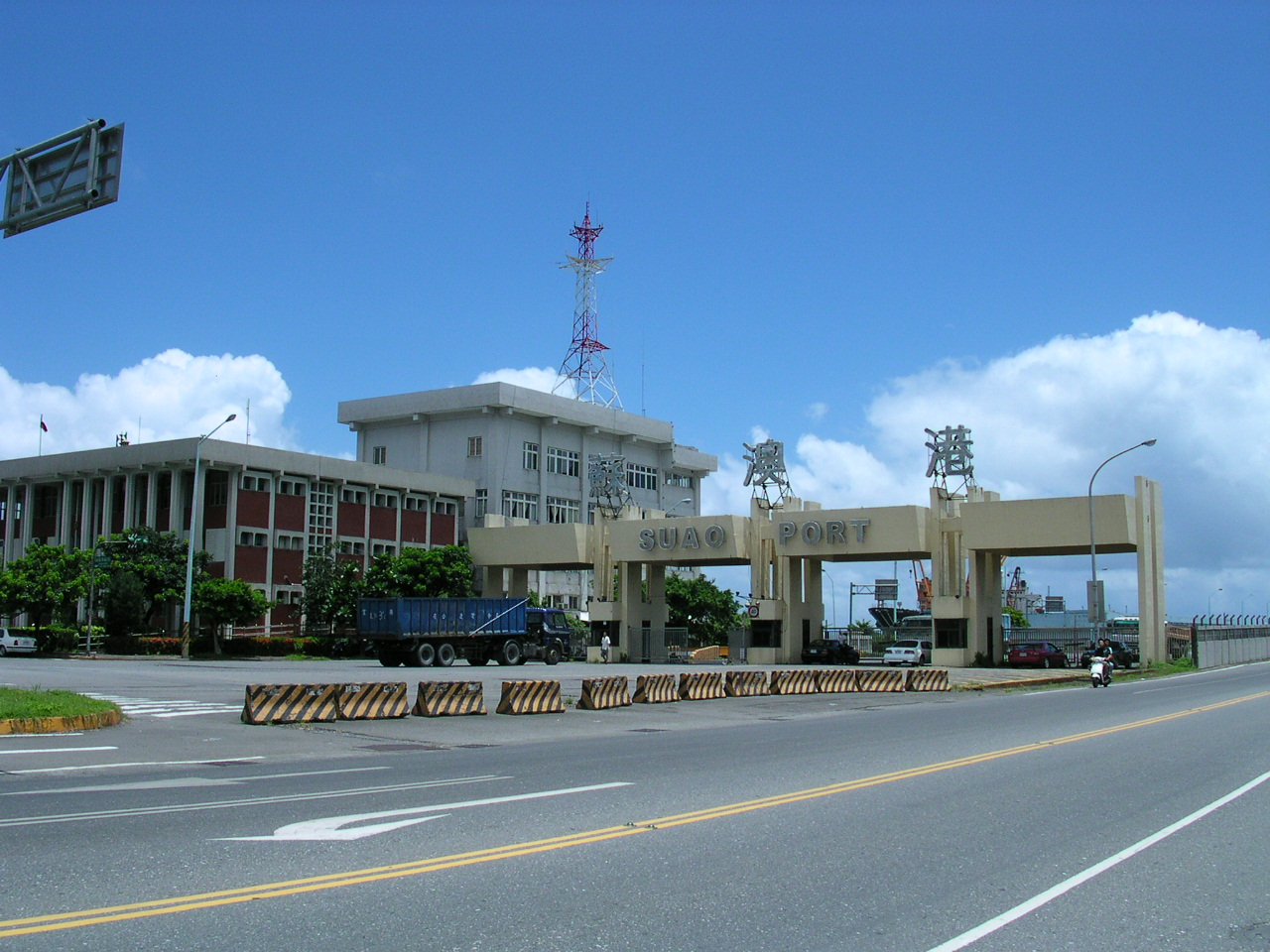
Administrative building in the Port of Suao

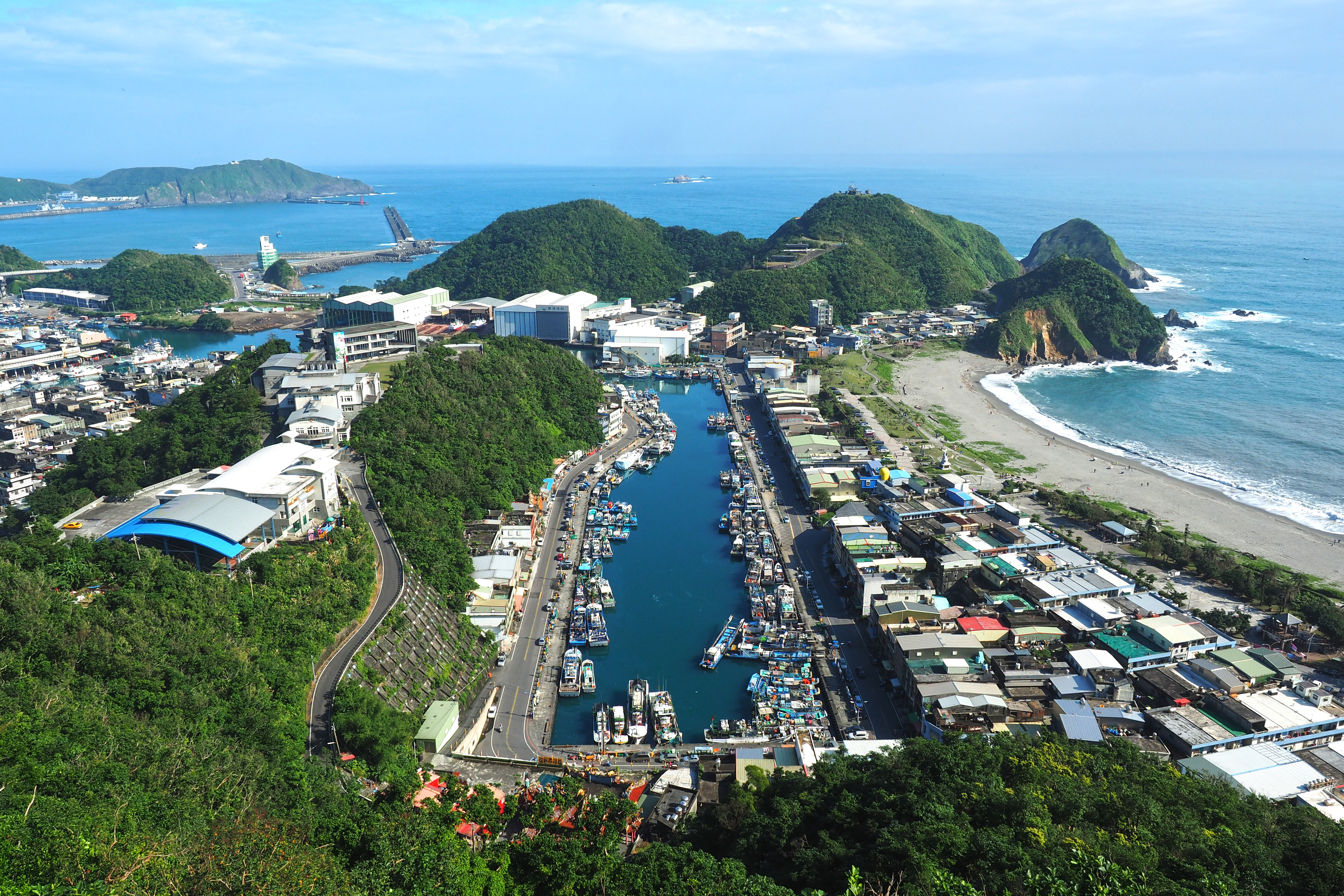
Neipi Harbor

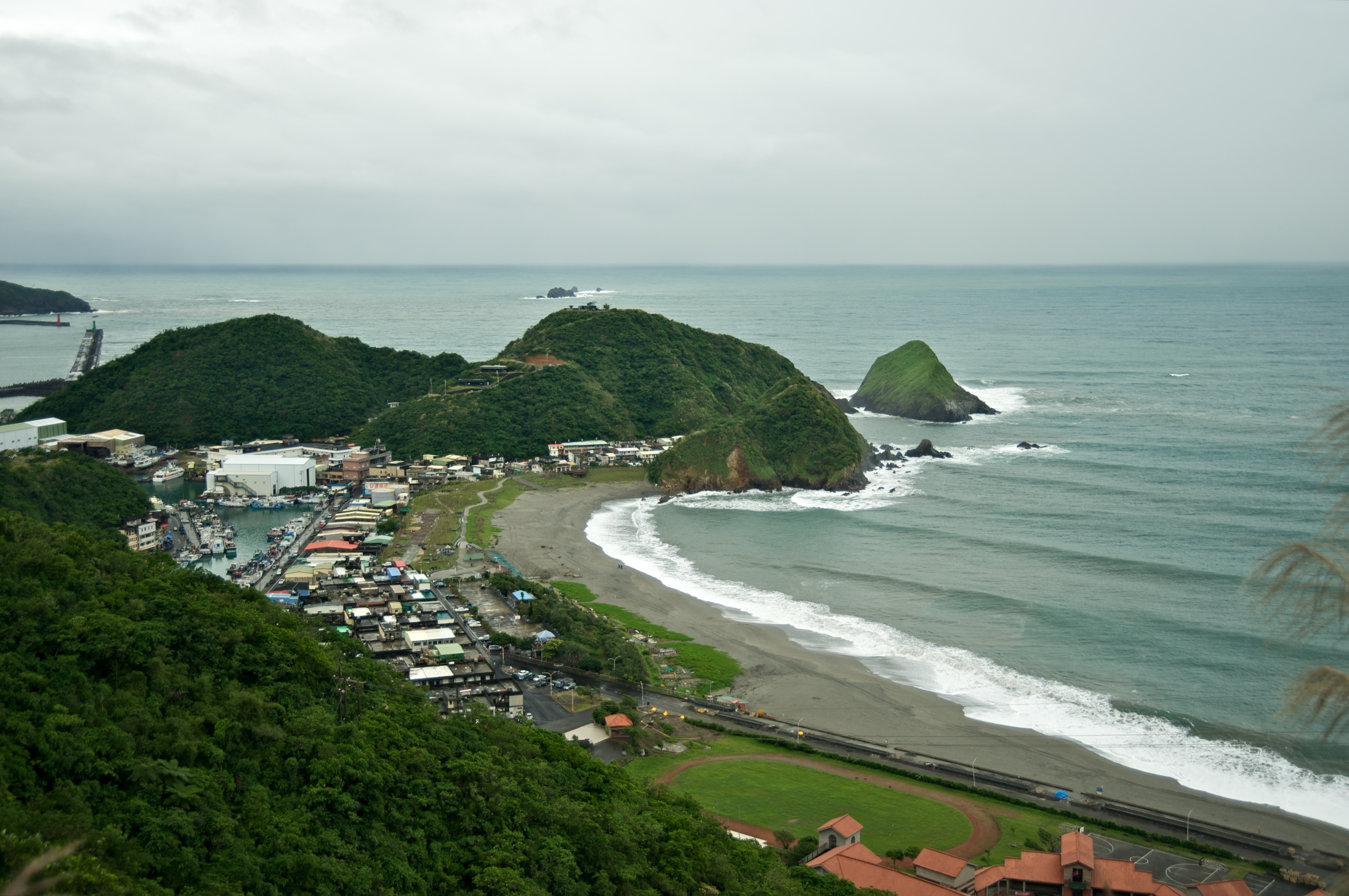
View of Neipi Beach

== See also ==
- Lungteh Shipbuilding
- Nanfang'ao Bridge
