= Mazu =

Chinese sea goddess

- Goddess of Sea, Heavenly Consort
- Member of Immortals of the Water Palace (水闕仙班)
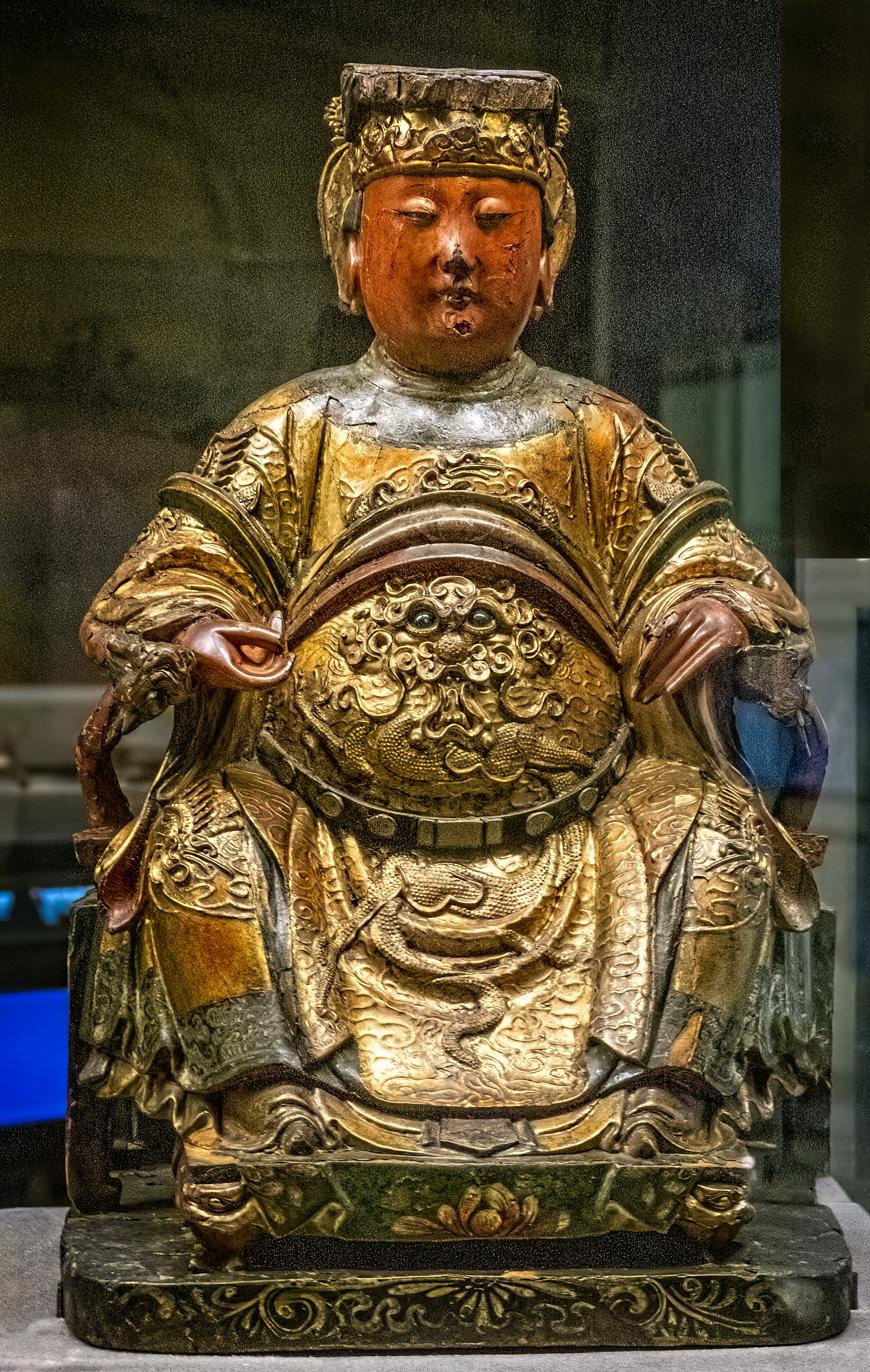
- 19th-century wooden Mazu statue, Field Museum of Natural History
- Other names: Lin Mo
- Symbols: Ruyi Scepter; Golden personal seal Poe; Pearl; Palace lantern Jade sail Weaving needle Sea snail shell Golden Anchor
- Gender: Female
- Temple: Mazu Temple

Genealogy
- Born: Lin Mo; 21 April 960; Meizhou Island, Putian County, Song Dynasty
- Died: 4 October 987; Nangan Island, Lienchang County, Song Dynasty
- Parents: Lin Yuan (Father); Lady Wang (Mother)

Mazu

Chinese name
- Traditional Chinese: 媽祖
- Simplified Chinese: 妈祖
- Literal meaning: "Mother Ancestor"
Transcriptions
Standard Mandarin
- Hanyu Pinyin: Māzǔ
- Wade–Giles: Ma^{1}-tsu^{3}
- IPA: [má.tsù]
Wu
- Wugniu: ma^{1} tsu^{3}
- IPA: Shanghainese: [ma˥ tsu˧]
Yue: Cantonese
- Yale Romanization: Māajóu
- Jyutping: Maa1-zou2
- IPA: [ma˥.tsɔw˧˥]
Southern Min
- Hokkien POJ: Má-chó͘
- Tâi-lô: Má-tsóo
Eastern Min
- Fuzhou BUC: Mă-cū

Lin Moniang
- Chinese: 林默娘
Transcriptions
Standard Mandarin
- Hanyu Pinyin: Lín Mòniáng
- Wade–Giles: Lin^{2} Mo^{4}-niang^{2}
- IPA: [lǐn mwô.njǎŋ]
Wu
- Wugniu: lin^{2} meq^{8} gnian^{2}
- IPA: Shanghainese: [lin˩ məʔ˦ ȵiã˩˦]
Yue: Cantonese
- Yale Romanization: Làhm Mahknèuhng
- Jyutping: Lam4 Mak6-noeng4
- IPA: [lɐm˩ mɐk̚˨.nœŋ˩]
Southern Min
- Hokkien POJ: Lîm Be̍k-niû / Lîm Bia̍k-niû / Lîm Be̍k-niô͘
- Tâi-lô: Lîm Bi̍k-niû / Lîm Bia̍k-niû / Lîm Bi̍k-niôo
Eastern Min
- Fuzhou BUC: Lìng Mĕk-Niòng

Japanese name
- Kanji: 媽祖
Transcriptions
- Romanization: Masobyō

Popular names

Granny Mazu
- Traditional Chinese: 媽祖婆
- Simplified Chinese: 妈祖婆
- Literal meaning: Granny Mazu
Transcriptions
Standard Mandarin
- Hanyu Pinyin: Māzǔpó
- Wade–Giles: Ma tsu3 p'o
Yue: Cantonese
- Yale Romanization: Māa Jóu pòh
- Jyutping: Maa1 Zou2 po4
Southern Min
- Hokkien POJ: Má-chó͘ -pô
- Tâi-lô: Má-tsóo-pô
Eastern Min
- Fuzhou BUC: Mă-cū-bò̤

Queen of Heaven
- Chinese: 天后
- Literal meaning: Celestial Empress
Transcriptions
Standard Mandarin
- Hanyu Pinyin: Tiānhòu
- Wade–Giles: T'ien-hou4
Wu
- Wugniu: tie^{1} gheu^{4}
- IPA: Shanghainese: [ti˥ ɦɤ˧]
Yue: Cantonese
- Yale Romanization: Tīn hauh
- Jyutping: Tin1 hau6
Southern Min
- Hokkien POJ: Thian-hiō
- Tâi-lô: Thian-hiō
Eastern Min
- Fuzhou BUC: Tiĕng-hâiu

Heavenly Consort
- Chinese: 天妃
- Literal meaning: Celestial Consort
Transcriptions
Standard Mandarin
- Hanyu Pinyin: Tiānfēi
- Wade–Giles: T'ien-fei
Yue: Cantonese
- Yale Romanization: Tīn fēi
- Jyutping: Tin1 fei1
Southern Min
- Hokkien POJ: Thian-hui
- Tâi-lô: Thian-hui
Eastern Min
- Fuzhou BUC: Tiĕng-hĭ

Holy Heavenly Mother
- Traditional Chinese: 天上聖母
- Simplified Chinese: 天上圣母
- Literal meaning: Heavenly-&-Sacred Mother
Transcriptions
Standard Mandarin
- Hanyu Pinyin: Tiānshàng Shèngmǔ
- Wade–Giles: T'ien shang4 sheng4 mu3
Wu
- Wugniu: tie^{1} zaon^{6} sen^{5} mu^{4}
- IPA: Shanghainese: [ti˥ zɑ̃˧ səŋ˧ mu˦]
Yue: Cantonese
- Yale Romanization: Tīn seuhng sing móuh
- Jyutping: Tin1 soeng6 sing3 mou4
Southern Min
- Hokkien POJ: Thian-siōng sèng-bó͘
- Tâi-lô: Thian-siōng sìng-bó
Eastern Min
- Fuzhou BUC: Tiĕng-siông séng-mō̤

Mazu Belief and Customs
- UNESCO Intangible Cultural Heritage

Mazu or Matsu is a sea goddess in Chinese folk religion, Chinese Buddhism, Confucianism, and Taoism. She is also known by several other names and titles. Mazu is the deified form of Lin Moniang (Chinese: 林默娘; pinyin: Lín Mòniáng; Pe̍h-ōe-jī: Lîm Be̍k-niû / Lîm Bia̍k-niû / Lîm Be̍k-niô͘), a shamaness from Fujian who is said to have lived in the late 10th century. After her death, she became revered as a tutelary deity of Chinese seafarers, including fishermen and sailors.

Her worship spread throughout China's coastal regions and overseas Chinese communities throughout Southeast Asia, where some Mazu temples are affiliated with famous Taiwanese temples. Traditionally, Mazu was believed to roam the seas, safeguarding her devotees through miraculous interventions. Her modern worship has expanded beyond the sea, however, and she is considered a Queen of Heaven.

Mazu worship is popular in Taiwan because many early Chinese settlers in Taiwan were Hoklo people from Fujian. Her temple festival is a major event in Taiwan, with the largest celebrations occurring in and around her temples at Dajia and Beigang.

== Names and titles ==
In addition to Mazu or Ma-tsu, meaning "Maternal Ancestor" "Mother", "Granny", or "Grandmother", Lin Moniang is worshipped under other names and titles:

- Mazupo (妈祖婆; 媽祖婆; 'Granny Mazu') or Ma Cho Po in Hokkien, a popular name in Fujian
- A-Ma, also spelled Ah-Ma (阿媽; 'Mother', 'Grandmother'), a popular name in Macau
- Linghui Furen ("Lady of Numinous Grace"), an official title conferred in 1156.
- Linghui Fei ("Princess of Numinous Grace"), an official title conferred in 1192.
- Tianfei ("Princess of Heaven", Wu Chinese: Thi-fi), fully Huguo Mingzhu Tianfei ("Illuminating Princess of Heaven who Protects the Nation"), an official title conferred in 1281.
- Huguo Bimin Miaoling Zhaoying Hongren Puji Tianfei ("Heavenly Princess who Protects the Nation and Shelters the People, of Marvelous Numen, Brilliant Resonance, Magnanimous Kindness, and Universal Salvation"), an official title conferred in 1409.
- Tianhou or Tianhou Shengmu (title used mostly in mainland China, Hong Kong, and Vietnam), also called Tin Hau in Cantonese, Thean Hou in Min Chinese and Thiên Hậu in Vietnamese (天后; 'Queen/Empress of Heaven'), an official title conferred in 1683.
- Tianshang Shengmu ("Holy Heavenly Mother"; title used mostly in Taiwan)
- Tongxian Lingnü (通贤灵女; 通賢靈女; 'Worthy & Efficacious Lady')
- Shennü (神女; 'Divine Woman')
- Zhaoxiao Chunzheng Fuji Ganying Shengfei ("Holy Princess of Clear Piety, Pure Faith, and Helpful Response"), an official title conferred during the reign of the Hongwu Emperor of the Ming.
- Gupozu (姑婆祖; 'Great-Grandaunt'), an unofficial title used by descendants whose surname is "Lin(林)", due to sharing the same surname Lin.

Although many of Mazu's temples honor her titles Tianhou and Tianfei, it became customary to never pray to her under those names during an emergency since it was believed that, hearing one of her formal titles, Mazu might feel obligated to groom and dress herself as properly befitting her station before receiving the petition. Prayers invoking her as Mazu were thought to be answered more quickly.

== History ==
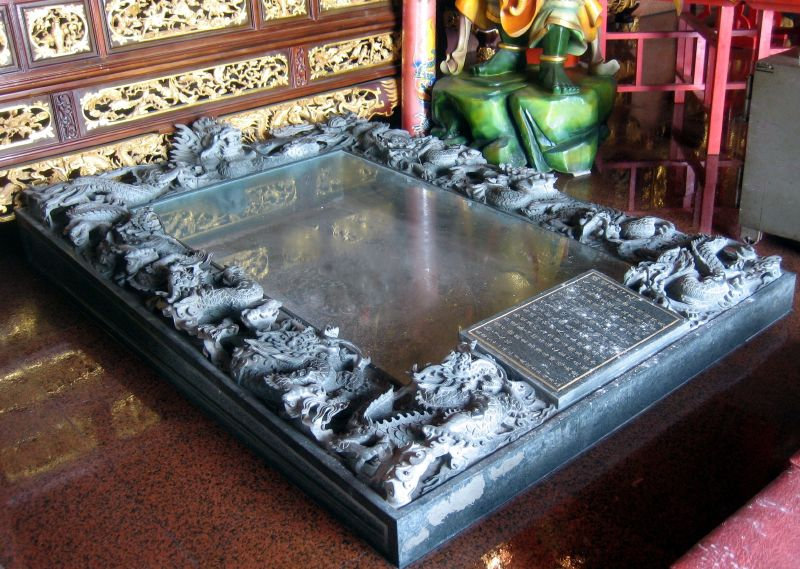
The alleged tomb of Lin Moniang in Nangan in the Matsu Islands

Very little is known of the historical Lin Moniang. She was apparently a shamaness from a small fishing village on Meizhou Island, part of Fujian's Putian County, in the late 10th century. She probably did not live there, but on the nearby mainland. (Note: She may have been born on the mainland as well.) During this era, Fujian was greatly sinicized by influxes of refugees fleeing invasions of northern China and it has been hypothesised that Mazu's cult represented a hybridization of Chinese and native indigenous culture. The earliest record of her cult is from two centuries later, an 1150 inscription that mentions "she could foretell a man's good and ill luck" and, "after her death, the people erected a temple for her on her home island".

== Legend ==
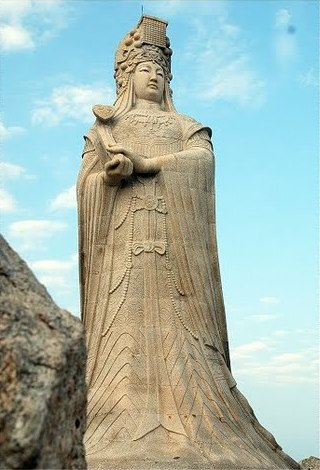
A statue of Mazu Goddess near Meizhou Mazu Temple grounds in Meizhou Island, Fujian, China

The legends around Lin Moniang's life were broadly established by the 12th century.

She was said to have been born under the reign of the Quanzhounese warlord Liu Congxiao (d. 962), in the Min Kingdom, which eventually developed into the specific date of the 23rd day of the third month of the Chinese lunar calendar (Note: This is sometimes mistakenly translated into English as "March 23", for example by Fuzhou University's overview of the Meizhou Temple.) in AD 960, the first year of the Song. (Note: The coincidence of the date, only attested in late sources, is often doubted by modern scholars such as Clark.) The late Ming Great Collection of the Three Teachings' Origin and Development and Research into the Divine, placed her birth much earlier, in 742.

The early sources speak of her as "Miss Lin". Her given name Mo ("Silent One") or Moniang ("the Silent Girl") appeared later. It was said to have been chosen when she did not cry during birth or during the first month afterwards. She remained a quiet and pensive child as late as four. She was said to have been the sixth or seventh daughter of Lin Yuan (林願). He is now usually remembered as one of the local fishermen, although the 1593 edition of the Records of Research into the Divine made him Putian's chief military inspector. The family was helpful and popular within their village.

Late legends intended to justify Mazu's presence in Buddhist temples held that her parents had prayed to Guanyin for a son but received yet another daughter. In one version, her mother dreamt of Guanyin giving her a magical pill to induce pregnancy and woke to find the pill still in her hand. Rather than being born in the conventional way, Mazu shot from her mother at birth in the form of a fragrant flash of red light. Mazu was said to have been especially devoted to Guanyin or was even an incarnation of Guanyin. For her part, Mazu was said to have been entranced by a statue of Guanyin at a temple she visited as a child, after which she became an ardent Buddhist.

She is now often said to have studied religious literature, mastering Confucius by 8 and the principal Buddhist sutras by 11. The Account of the Blessings Revealed by the Princess of Heaven (天妃顯聖錄; 天妃显圣录; Tiānfēi Xiǎnshèng Lù) collected by her supposed descendants Lin Yaoyu (林堯俞; 林尧俞; Lín Yáoyú; fl. 1589) and Lin Linchang (林麟焻; Lín Línchàng; fl. 1670) claimed that, while still a girl, she was visited by a Taoist master (elsewhere a Buddhist monk) named Xuantong (玄通; Xuántōng) who recognized her Buddha nature. By 13, she had mastered the book of lore he had left her (玄微袐法; Xuánwēi Bìfǎ) and gained the abilities to see the future and visit places in spirit without travel.

She was able to manifest herself at a distance as well and used this power to visit gardens in the surrounding countryside, although she asked owners' permission before gathering any flowers to take home. Although she only started swimming at the relatively late age of 15, she soon excelled at it. She was said to have stood on the shore in red garments to guide fishing boats home, regardless of harsh or dangerous weather. She met a Taoist immortal at a fountain at sixteen and received an amulet or two bronze tablets, which she translated or used to exorcize demons, to heal the sick, and to avert disasters. She was said to be a rainmaker during times of drought.

Mazu's principal legend concerns her saving one or some members of her family, when they were caught offshore during a typhoon, usually when she was 16. It appears in several forms. In one, the women at home feared Lin Yuan and his son were lost but Mazu fell into a trance while weaving at her loom. Her spiritual power began to save the men from drowning but her mother roused her, causing her to drop her brother into the sea. The father returned and told the other villagers of the miracle. This version of the story is preserved in murals at Fengtin in Fujian.

One variant is that her brothers were saved, but her father was lost. She then spent three days and nights searching for his body before finding it. Another version is that all the men returned safely. Another is that Mazu was praying to Guanyin; another that she was sleeping and assisting her family through her dream. Another is that the boats were crewed by her four brothers and that she saved three of them, securing their boats together, with the eldest lost owing to the interference of her parents, who mistook her trance for a seizure and woke her.

In earlier records, Mazu died unmarried at 27 or 28. Her celibacy was sometimes ascribed to a vow she took after losing her brother at sea. The date of her passing eventually became the specific date of the Double Ninth Festival in 987, making her 27 by western reckoning and 28 by traditional Chinese dating. She was said to have died in meditation. In some accounts she did not die, but climbed a mountain alone and ascended into Heaven as a goddess in a beam of bright light. In others, she died protesting an unwanted betrothal. Another places her death at age 16, saying she drowned after exhausting herself in a failed attempt to find her lost father, underlining her filial piety. Her corpse then washed ashore on Nangan Island, which preserves a gravesite said to be hers.

== Myths ==
In addition to the legends surrounding her earthly life, Mazu figures in a number of Chinese myths:

- In one, the demons Qianliyan ("Thousand-Mile Eye") and Shunfeng'er ("Wind-Following Ear") both fell in love with her and she conceded that she would marry the one who defeated her in combat. Using her martial arts skills, however, she subdued them both and, after becoming friends, hired them as her guardian generals.
- In a book of the Taoist Canon (太上老君說天妃救苦靈驗經; 太上老君说天妃救苦灵验经; Tàishàng Lǎojūn Shuō Tiānfēi Jiùkǔ Língyàn Jīng), the Jade Woman of Marvelous Deeds (妙行玉女) is a star from the Big Dipper brought to earth by Laojun, the divine form of Laozi, to show his compassion for those who might be lost at sea. She is incarnated as Mazu and swears not only to protect sailors but to oversee all facets of life and death, providing help to anyone who might call upon her.

== Legacy ==
=== Worship ===
Dressed in red, she shows her divine power.
In the fourth year of the Xuanhe period of emperor Huizong of the Song dynasty, with the cyclical signs ren yin (1122), the Supervising Secretary Lu Yundi received an order to go on a mission to Korea. On his way through the Eastern Sea, he ran into a hurricane. Of the eight ships, seven were wrecked. Only Lu's ship did not capsize in the turbulent waves. As he prayed ardently to heaven for protection, he saw a goddess appear above the mast. Dressed in red, she was sitting still in a formal manner. Lu kowtowed and begged for protection. In the midst of the seething sea, the wind and waves calmed down suddenly, so that Lu was saved. After he had returned from Korea, he told his story to everyone. The Gentleman who Guards Righteousness, Li Zhen, a man who had visited (Sheng)dun for a long time, told him everything about the merciful manifestations of the holy princess. Lu said: "In this world, it is only my parents who have always shown endless kindness. Yet, when in the course of my vagrant life I almost arrived at the brink of death, not even my father and mother, in spite of their utmost parental love, could help me, while a divine girl, by simply breathing, was able to reach out to me. That day, I truly received the gift of rebirth." When Lu reported on his mission to the court, he memorialized the merciful manifestation of the goddess. He received the order to allow the words "Smooth crossing" to be used on a temple tablet, remit taxes on the temple fields, and make temple offerings at Jiangkou.

— Tianfei Xiansheng Lu (early 17th century) about Lu Yundi's encounter with the goddess

Mazuism is first attested in Huang Gongdu's c. 1140 poem "On the Shrine of the Smooth Crossing" (順濟廟; 顺济庙; Shùnjì Miào), which considered her a menial and misguided shamaness whose continued influence was inexplicable. He notes that her devotees danced and sang together and with their children. Shortly afterwards, Liao Pengfei (廖鵬飛)'s 1150 inscription at the village of Ninghai (now Qiaodou Village) in Putian was more respectful. (Note: The inscription, entitled Shengdun Zumiao Chongjian Shunji Miao Ji (聖頓祖廟重建顺濟廟記), is preserved in a Li family genealogy (百塘李氏族譜; Baitang Lishi Zupu) and its legitimacy is sometimes questioned. It was translated in its entirety into English by Klaas Ruitenbeek.) It states that, "after her death, the people erected a temple for her on her home island" and that the Temple of the Sacred Mound (聖墩廟; 圣墩庙; Shèngdūn Miào) was raised in 1086 after some people in Ninghai saw it glowing, discovered a miraculous old raft or stump, and experienced a vision of "the goddess of Meizhou". (Note: A similar story later circulated regarding the establishment of the temple at Fengting.)

This structure had been renamed the Smooth Crossing Temple by Emperor Huizong of Song in 1123 after his envoy Lu Yundi (路允迪; Lù Yǔndí) was miraculously saved during a storm the year before while on an official mission to pay respects to the court of Goryeo upon the death of its king, Yejong, and to replace the Liao dynasty as the formal suzerains investing his successor, Injong. (Note: The official account of the journey credited the miracle to now-forgotten "God of Yanyu in Fuzhou", the deified form of the eldest son of Chen Yan, a 9th-century warlord in the region. However, it's believed that the legendary account of Mazu saving only one of Lu's ships was mistaken and most or all of them survived, with their Fujianese merchant crews crediting their survival to different local deities, including the "Divine Lady" of Ninghai on Li Zhen's presumably Putianese ship. The Yanyu Temple received the title "Manifesting Merit" (zhaoli) from the Song court around the same time it honored the Ninghai shrine.)

Her worship subsequently spread: Li Junfu's early-13th century Putian Bishi records temples on Meizhou and at Qiaodou, Jiangkou, and Baihu. By 1257, Liu Kezhuang was noting Putian's "large market towns and small villages all have... shrines to the Princess" and that they had spread to Fengting to the south. By the end of the Song dynasty, there were at least 31 temples to Mazu, reaching at least as far as Shanghai in the north and Guangzhou in the south.

The power of the goddess, having indeed been manifested in previous times, has been abundantly revealed in the present generation. In the midst of the rushing waters it happened that, when there was a hurricane, suddenly a divine lantern was seen shining at the masthead, and as soon as that miraculous light appeared the danger was appeased, so that even in the peril of capsizing one felt reassured and that there was no cause for fear.

— Admiral Zheng He and his associates (Changle inscription, early 15th century) about witnessing the goddess' divine lantern, which represented the natural phenomena Saint Elmo's fire

As Mazuism spread, it began to absorb the cults of other local shamanesses such as the other two of Xianyou's "Three Princesses" and even some lesser maritime and agricultural gods, including Liu Mian and Zhang the Heavenly Instructor. By the 12th century, she had already become a guardian to the people of Qiaodou when they suffered drought, flood, epidemic, piracy, or brigandage. She protected women during childbirth and assisted with conception.

As the patron of the seas, her temples were among the first erected by arriving overseas Chinese, as they gave thanks for their safe passage. Despite his Islamic upbringing, the Ming admiral and explorer Zheng He credited Mazu for protecting one of his journeys, prompting a new title for Mazu in 1409, "Celestial Consort of Universal Salvation". Zheng patronized the Mazu temples of Nanjing and prevailed upon the Yongle Emperor to construct the city's Tianfei Palace; because of its imperial patronage and prominent location in the empire's southern capital, this was long the largest and highest-status center of Mazuism in China.

During the Southern Ming resistance to the Qing, Mazu was credited with helping Koxinga's army capture Taiwan from the Dutch; she was later said to have personally aided some of Shi Lang's men in defeating Liu Guoxuan at Penghu in 1683, ending the independent kingdom of Koxinga's descendants and placing Taiwan under Qing control. The Ming prince Zhu Shugui's palace was converted into Tainan's Grand Matsu Temple, the first to bear her new title of "Heavenly Empress".

In late imperial China, sailors often carried effigies of Mazu to ensure safe crossings. Some boats still carry small shrines on their bows. Mazu charms are also used as medicine, including as salves for blistered feet. As late as the 19th century, the Qing government officially credited her divine intervention with their 1884 victory over the French at Tamsui District during the Sino-French War and specially honored the town's temple to her, which had served as General Sun Kaihua's headquarters during the fighting. When US forces bombed Taiwan during World War II, Mazu was said to intercept bombs and defend the people.

Today, Mazuism is practiced in about 1,500 temples in 26 countries around the world, mostly in the Sinosphere or the overseas Chinese communities such as that of the predominantly Hokkien Philippines. Of these temples, almost 1000 are on Taiwan, representing a doubling of the 509 temples recorded in 1980 and more than a dozen times the number recorded before 1911. These temples are generally registered as Taoist, although some are considered Buddhist.

There are more than 90 Mazu Temples in Hong Kong. In Mainland China, Mazuism is formally classified as a cult outside of Buddhism and Taoism, although numerous Buddhist, Confucianist and Taoist temples include shrines to her. Her worship is generally permitted but not encouraged, with most surviving temples concentrated around Putian in Fujian. Including the twenty on Meizhou Island, there are more than a hundred in the prefecture and another 70 elsewhere in the province, mostly in the settlements along its coast. There are more than 40 temples in Guangdong and Hainan and more than 30 in Zhejiang and Jiangsu, but many historical temples are now treated as museums and operated by local parks or cultural agencies.

From the early 2000s, pilgrimages from Taiwan to temples in Fujian have been permitted, particularly to the one in Yongchun, where Taiwan's Xingang Mazu Temple has been allowed to open a branch temple.

A major project to build the world's tallest Mazu statue at Tanjung Simpang Mengayau in Kudat, Borneo, was officially launched by Sabah. The statue was to be 10 stories high, but was canceled due to protests from Muslims in Sabah and political interference.

Informal centers of pilgrimage for Mazu's believers include Meizhou Island, the Zhenlan Temple in Taichung on Taiwan, and Xianliang Temple in Xianliang Harbor, Putian. Together with Meizhou Island, the Xianliang Temple is considered the most sacred place to Mazu, whose supposed death happened on the seashore of Xianliang Harbor. A ceremony attended by pilgrims from different provinces of China and from Taiwan commemorates this legendary event each year in October.

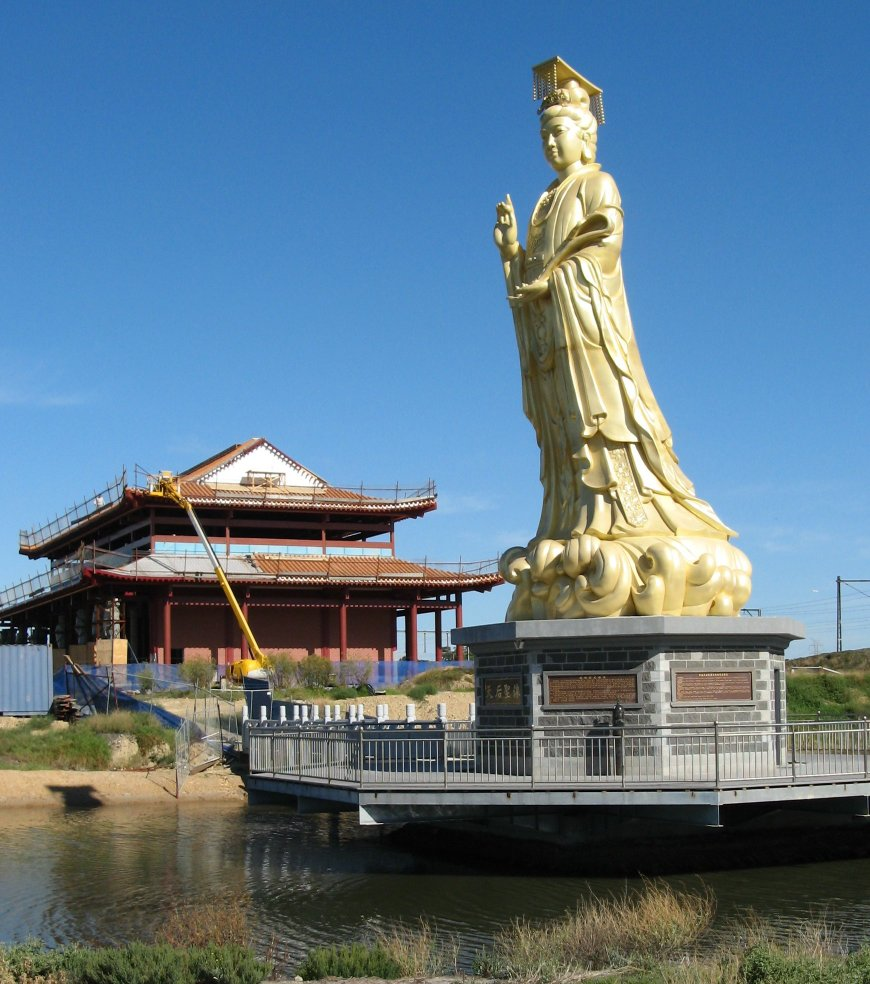
A statue of Mazu at the Heavenly Queen Temple in Footscray, Victoria.

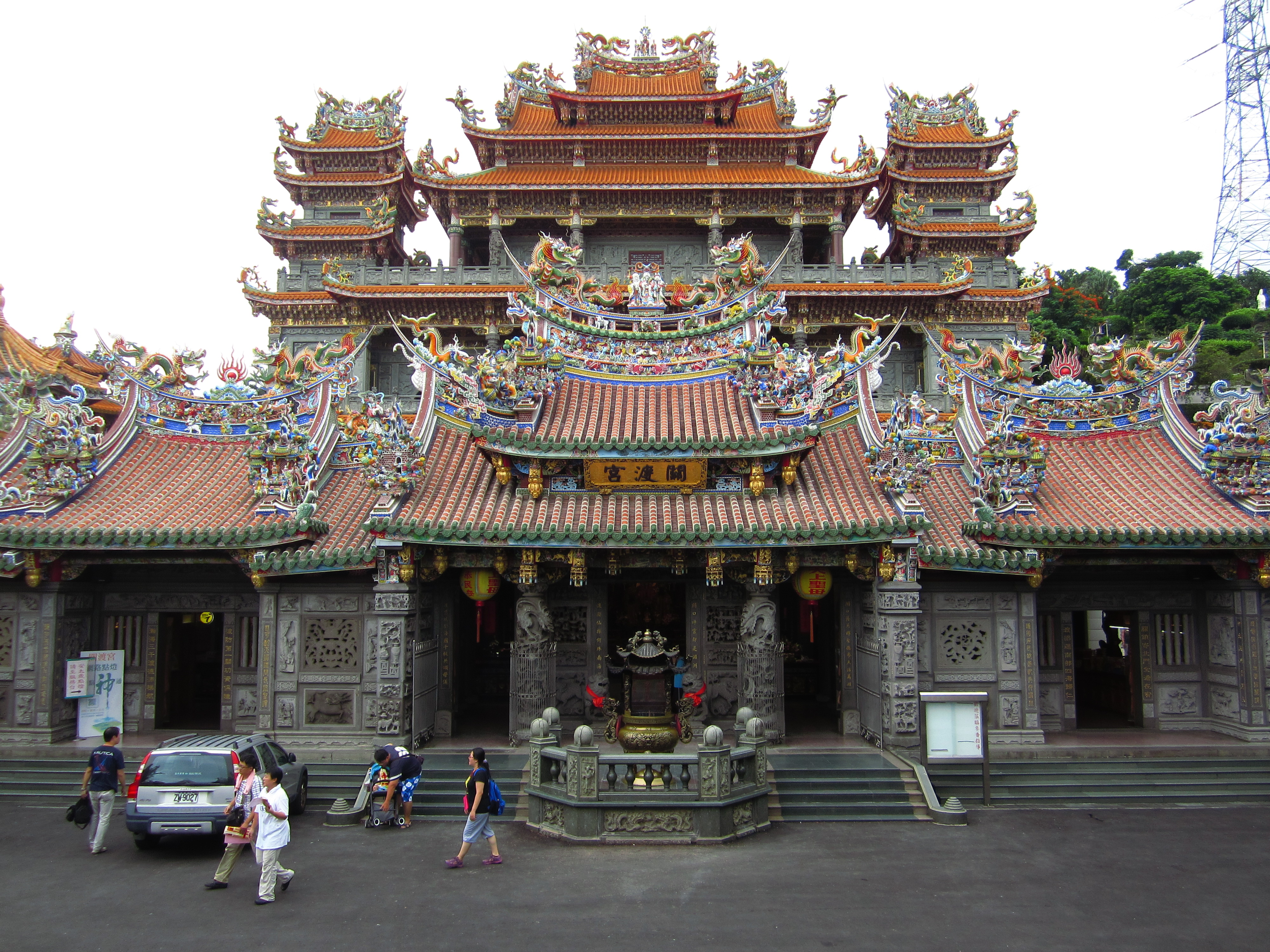
Guandu Temple at Beitou, Taipei, Taiwan.

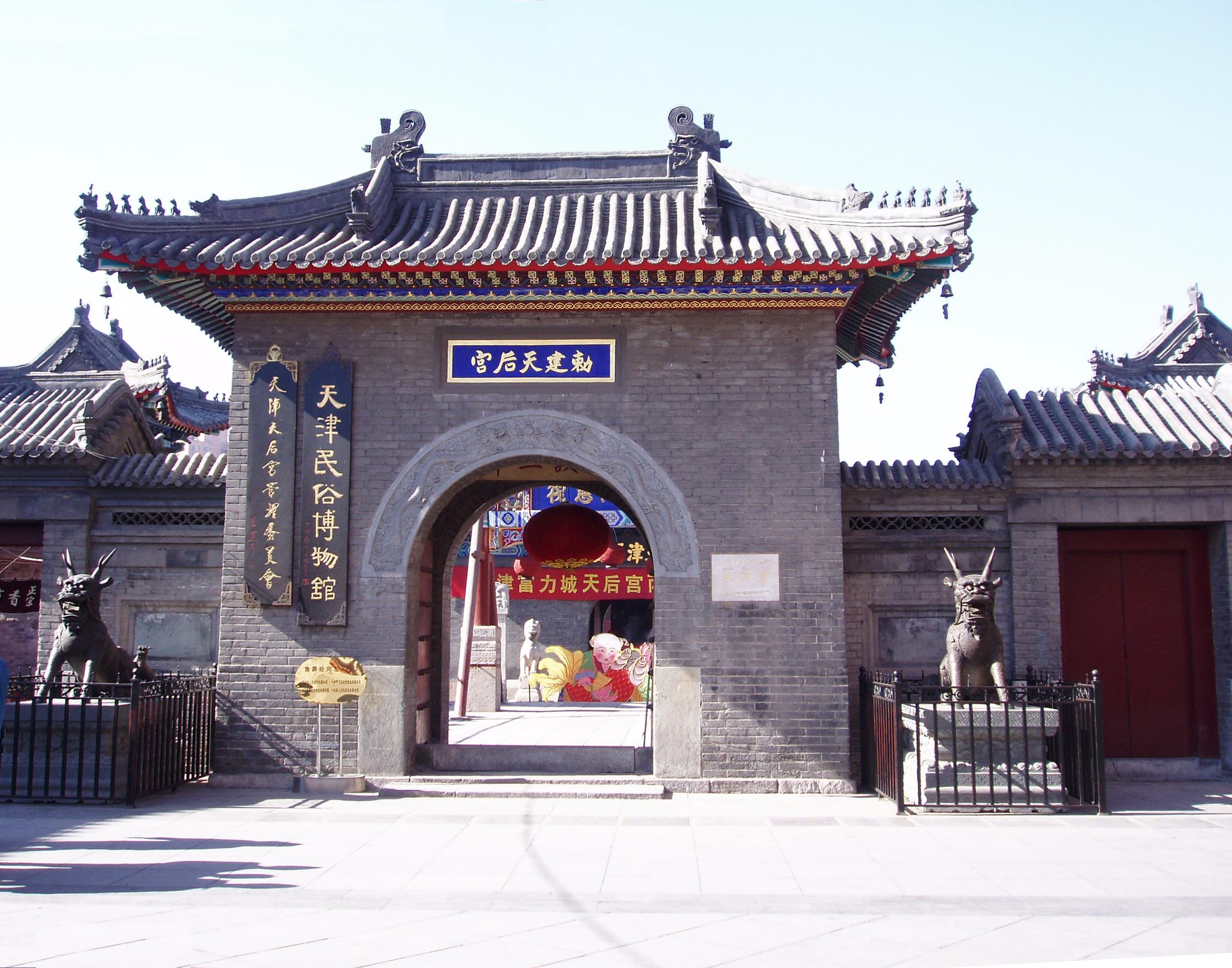
Tianhou Temple at Tianjin, China. The northernmost Mazu Temple in China.

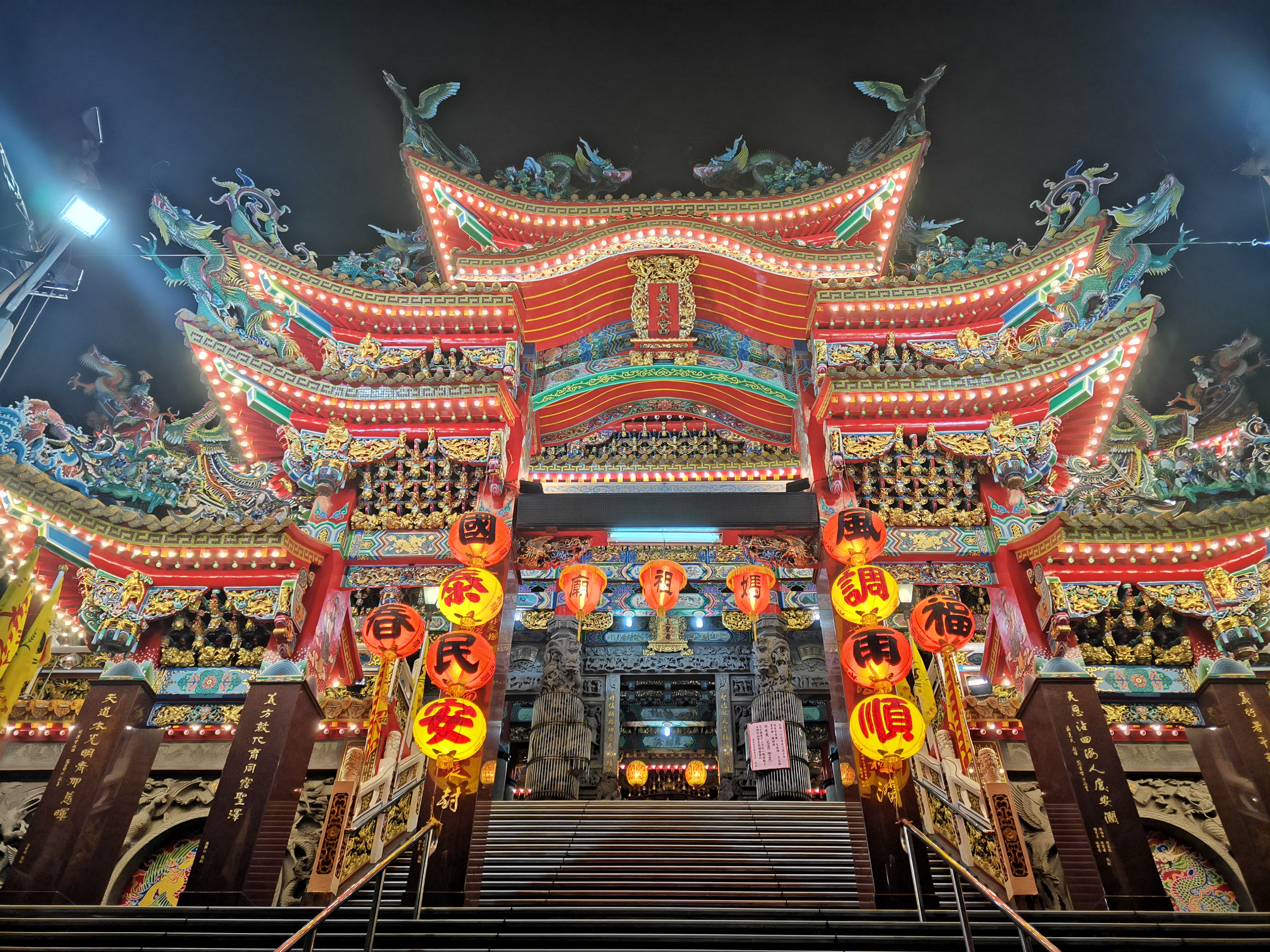
Sanchong Yi Tian Temple at Sanchong District, New Taipei, Taiwan.

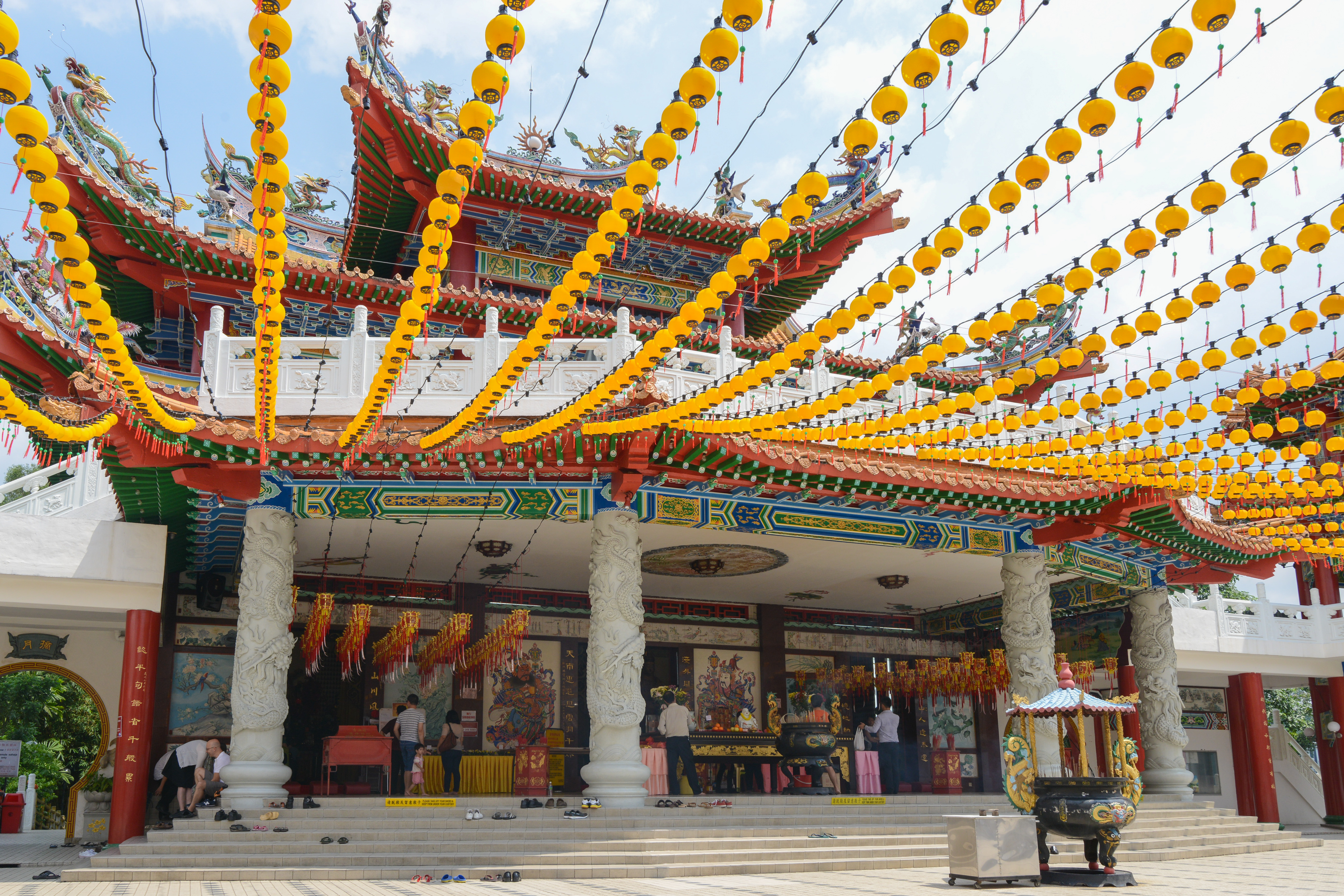
Thean Hou Temple in Kuala Lumpur, Malaysia.

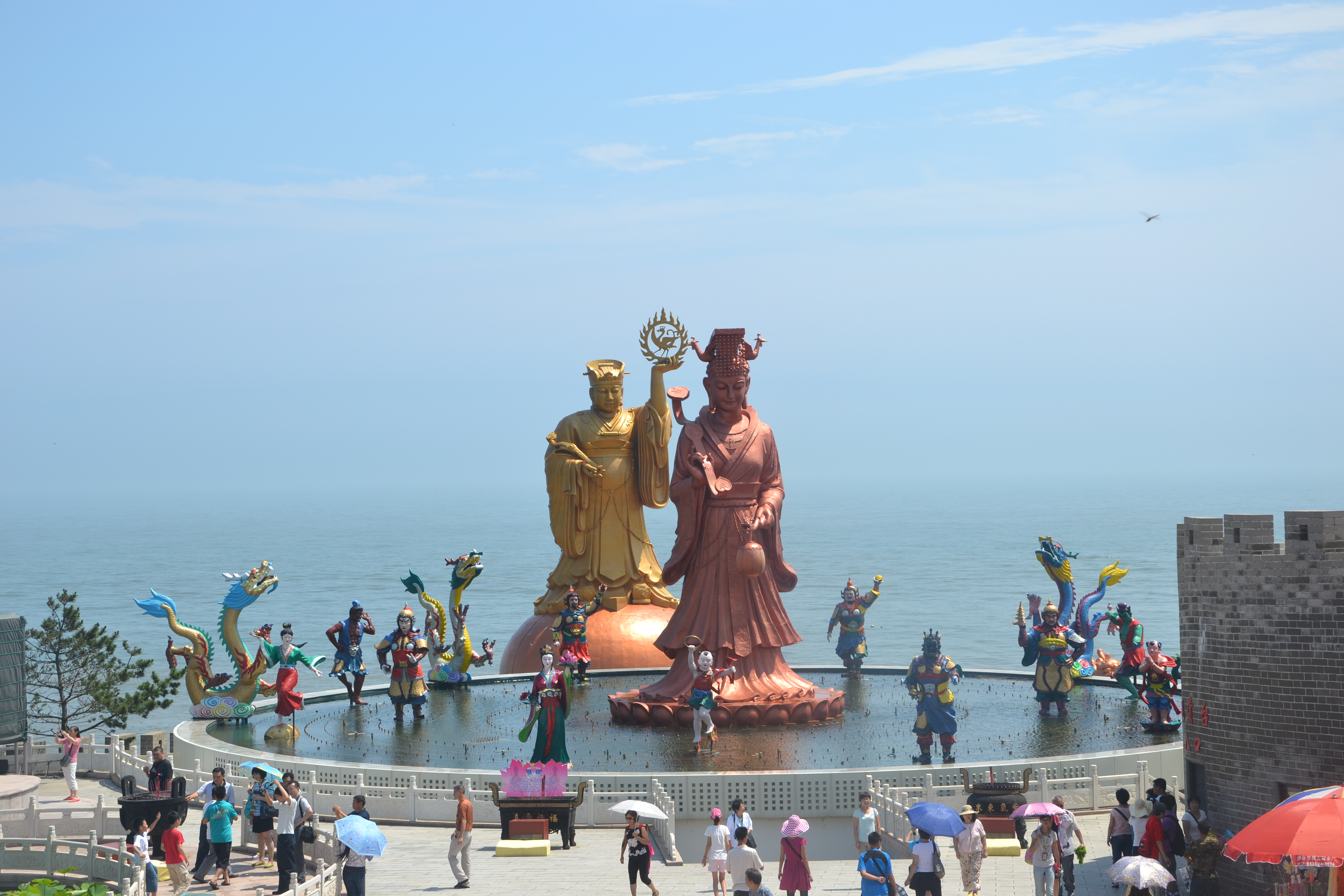
A statue of Mazu (center), carrying a lantern and ceremonial ruyi, in Weihai.

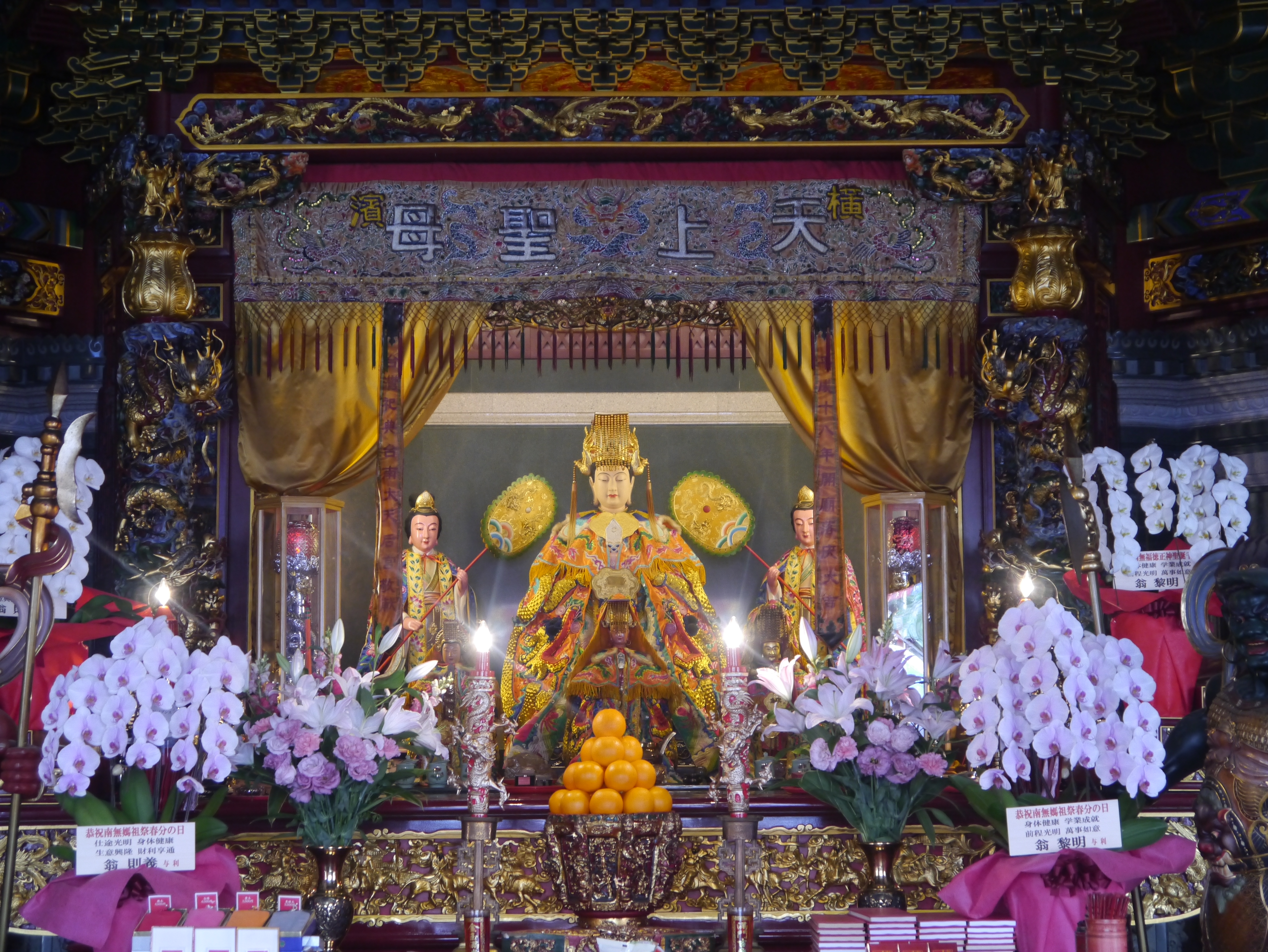
Yokohama Masobyō (Mazu) Temple, Inner Altar, in Japan

=== Pilgrimages ===
The primary temple festival in Mazuism is Lin Moniang's traditional birthday on the 23rd day of the 3rd month of the Chinese lunar calendar. In Taiwan, there are two major pilgrimages made in her honor, the Dajia Mazu Pilgrimage and the Baishatun Mazu Pilgrimage. In both festivals, pilgrims walk more than 300 kilometers to carry a litter containing statues of the goddess between two temples. Another major festival is that around the Tianhou Temple in Lukang. Depending on the year, Mazu's festival day may fall as early as mid-April or as late as mid-May.

The anniversary of her death or supposed ascension into Heaven is also celebrated, usually on the Double Ninth Festival (the ninth day of the ninth month of the lunar calendar).

=== Use by the Chinese Communist Party ===
The United Front Work Department of the Central Committee of the Chinese Communist Party (CCP) has utilized Mazu as a tool to advocate for Chinese unification. According to academic Chang Kuei-min of National Taiwan University, the CCP has "created a narrative that it is a champion of Chinese folk religion" and Mazu has become part of that narrative. In 2011, CCP general secretary Xi Jinping instructed cadres to "make full use" of Mazu for Chinese unification efforts. Temples in Taiwan, especially in rural areas, have been the most prominent targets for influence operations as they are meeting grounds for prominent local figures, and financial donations to temples remain unregulated. United front-linked groups have sponsored paid trips for Taiwanese to visit Mazu-related temples in Fujian.

=== In art ===
After her death, Mazu was remembered as a young lady who wore a red dress as she roamed over the seas. In religious statuary, she is usually clothed in the attire of an empress, and decorated with accessories such as a ceremonial hu tablet and a flat-topped imperial cap (冕冠; mian'guan) with rows of beads (liu) hanging from the front and back. Her temples are usually protected by the door gods Qianliyan (千里眼) and Shunfeng'er (順風耳). These vary in appearance but are frequently demons, Qianliyan red with two horns and two yellow sapphire eyes and Shunfeng'er green with one horn and two ruby eyes.

Lin Moniang (2000), a minor Fujianese TV series, was a dramatization of Mazu's life as a mortal. Mazu (海之傳說媽祖, 2007) was a Taiwanese animated feature film from the Chinese Cartoon Production Co. depicting her life as a shamaness and goddess. Its production director Teng Chiao admitted the limited appeal to the domestic market: "If young people were our primary target audience, we wouldn't tell the story of Mazu in the first place since they are not necessarily interested in the ancient legend[;] neither do they have loyalty to made-in-Taiwan productions". Instead, "when you look to global markets, the question that foreign buyers always ask is what can best represent Taiwan". Mazu, with its story about "a magic girl and two cute sidekicks [Mazu's door gods Qianliyan and Shunfeng'er] spiced up with a strong local flavor", was instead designed with an intent to appeal to international markets interested in Taiwan.

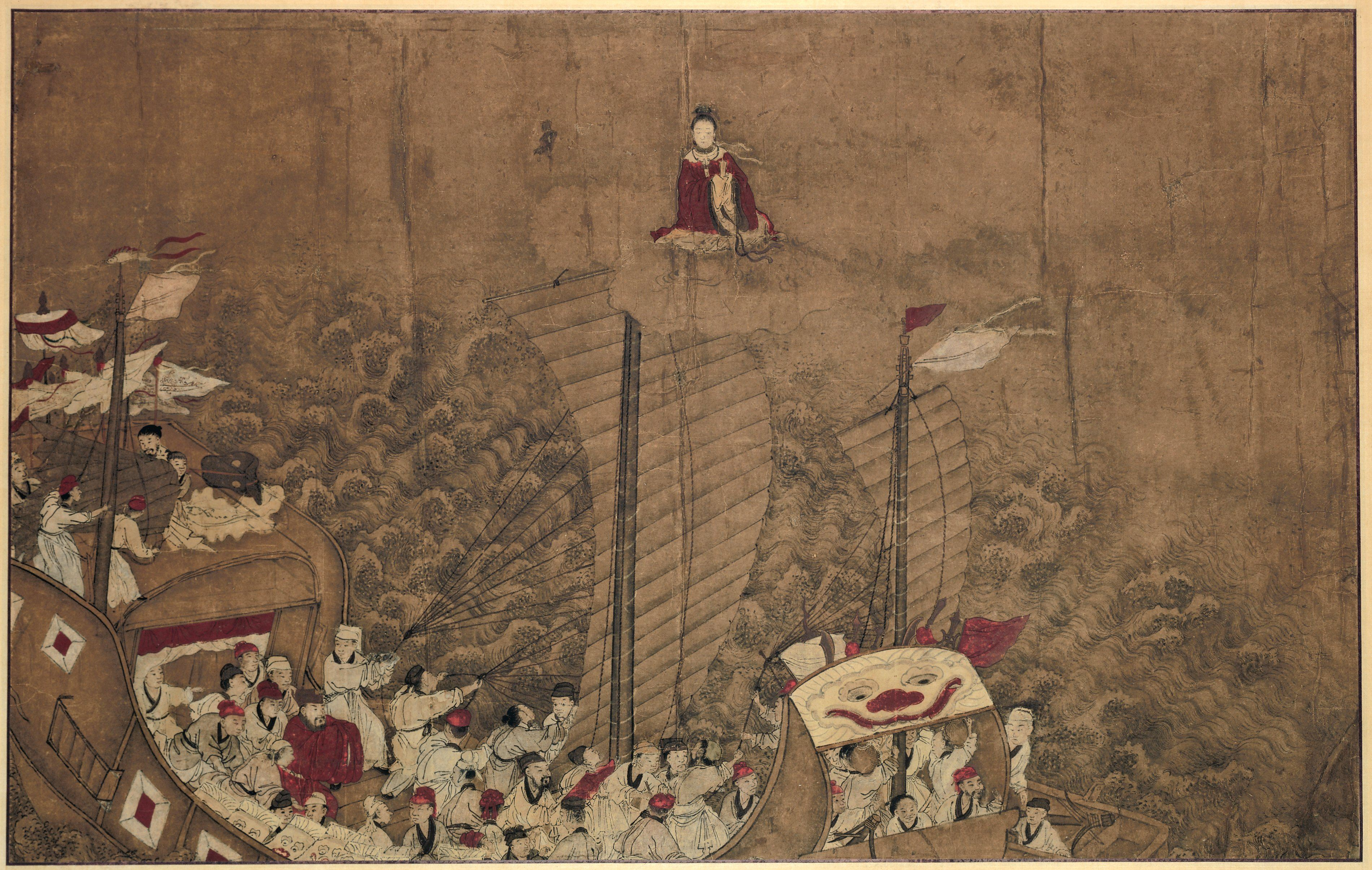
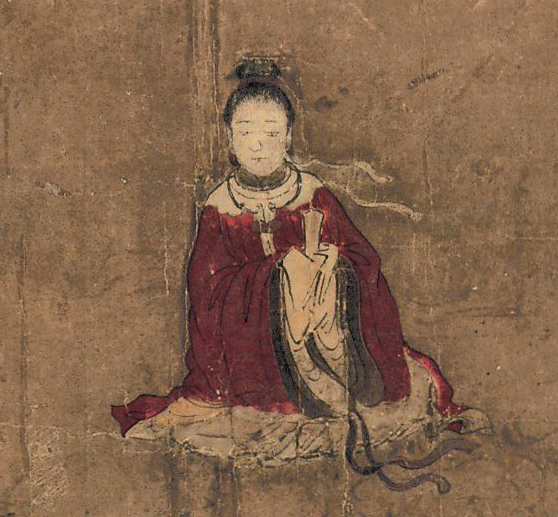
Detail of an 18th-century painting depicting Mazu during her rescue of the 1123 Song embassy to Goryeo on the high seas, in the Rijksmuseum, Netherlands

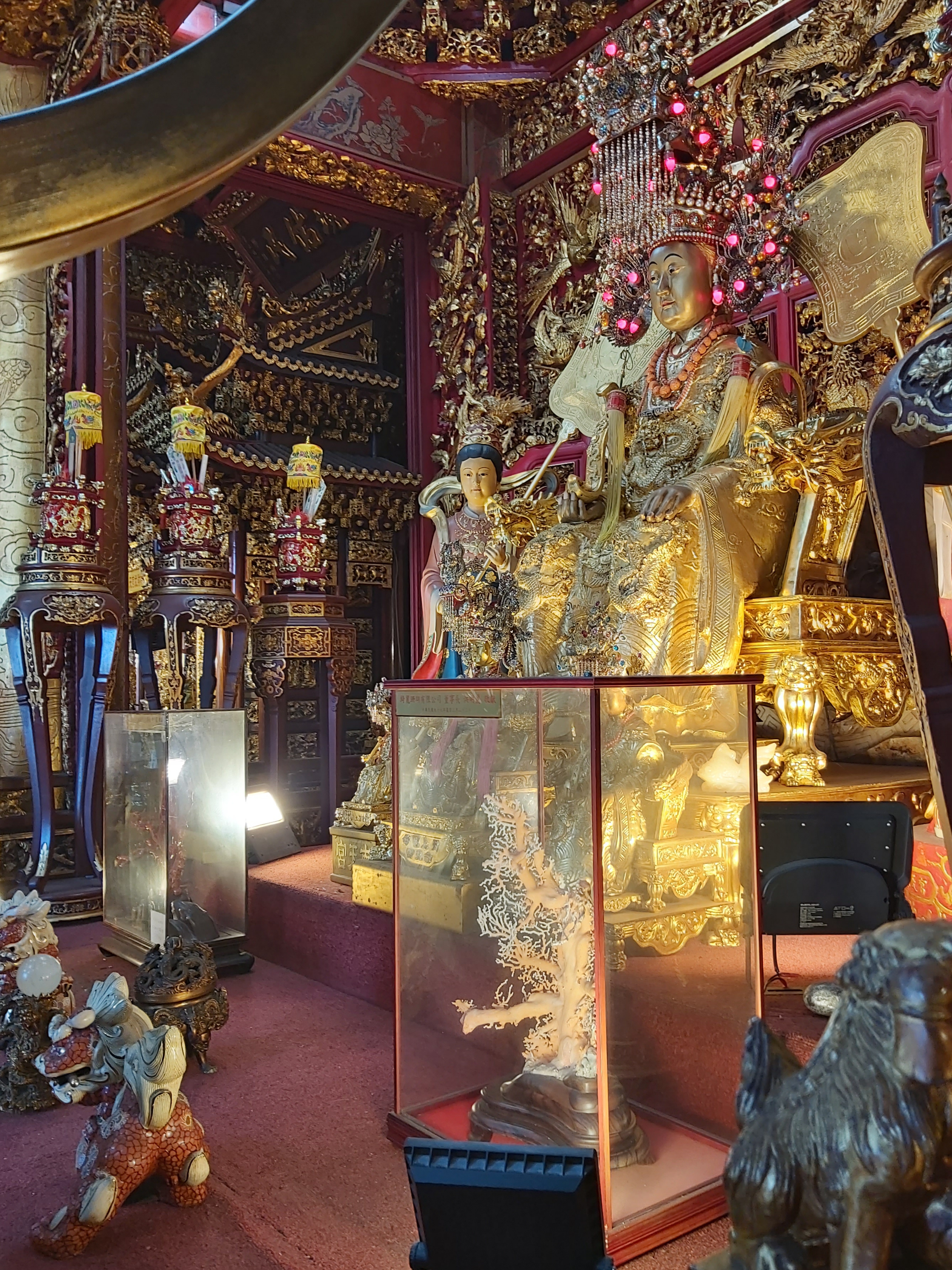
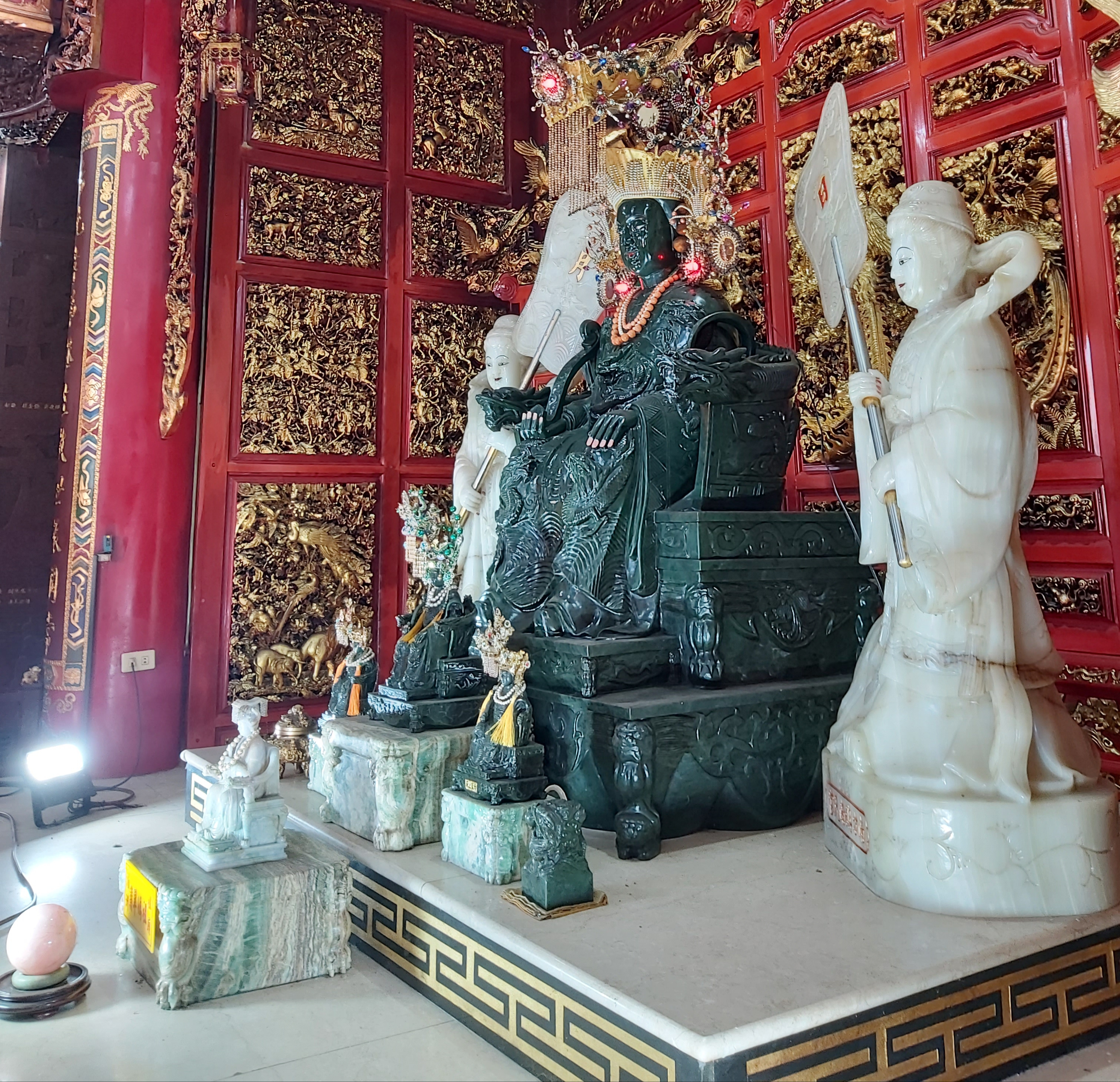
Statues of Mazu made of Gold and Jade in Nantian Temple, Nanfang'ao, Su'ao Township, Yilan County, Taiwan

== See also ==
- Macau, named after a nearby Temple of Mazu
- Air pollution in Hong Kong § Joss paper and incense burning
- List of Mazu temples around the world
- Dragon King
- Ngaleima
- Tin Hau temples in Hong Kong
- Hung Shing Ye (洪聖爺)
- Qianliyan & Shunfeng'er
- Meenakshi
- Kumari (goddess)
- Queen Mother of the West
