= Nanfang'ao Bridge =

Collapsed bridge in Yilan County, Taiwan

Nanfang'ao Bridge 南方澳大橋
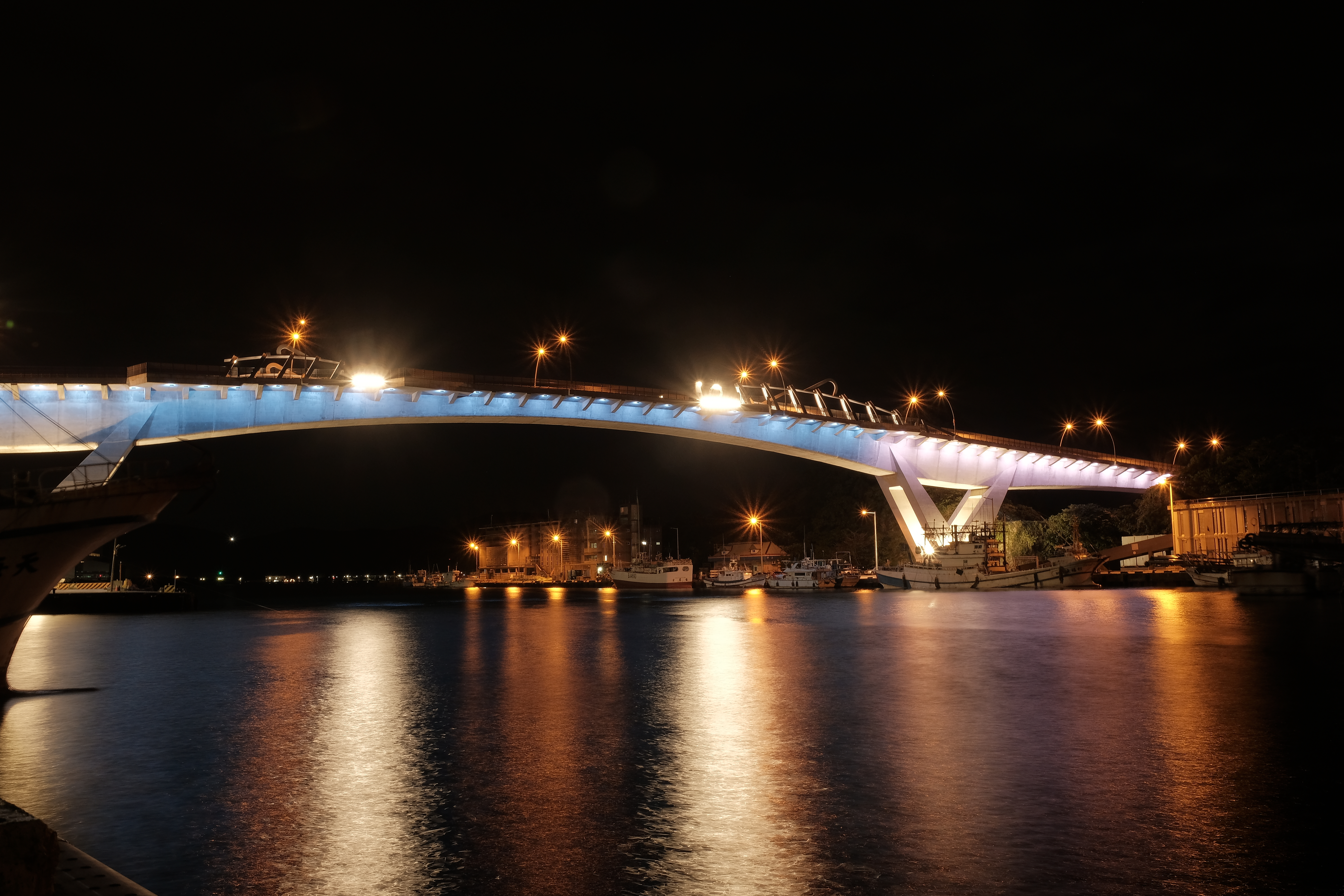
- The new Nanfangao Bridge
- Coordinates: 24°35′9″N 121°52′10″E
- Locale: Su'ao, Yilan County, Taiwan
- Maintained by: Taiwan International Ports Corporation

Characteristics
- Design: tied-arch bridge
- Material: Steel
- Total length: 140 m (459 ft)
- Width: 15 m (49 ft)
- Height: 18 m (59 ft)

History
- Designer: MAA Consultants
- Construction start: 1996; 30 years ago
- Construction end: 1998; 28 years ago
- Collapsed: 1 October 2019; 6 years ago
- Replaced: Old Nanfang'ao Bridge

Location
- Interactive map of Nanfang'ao Bridge

The Nanfang'ao Bridge (traditional Chinese: 南方澳大橋; simplified Chinese: 南方澳大桥; pinyin: Nánfāng'ào Dàqiáo) was a bridge in Nanfang'ao Fishing Port, Su'ao Township, Yilan County, Taiwan. It was the only steel single-arch bridge in Taiwan and was maintained by Taiwan International Ports Corporation. Construction began in 1996, and was finished in 1998. The bridge collapsed on 1 October 2019, killing six people and injuring 12.

== History ==
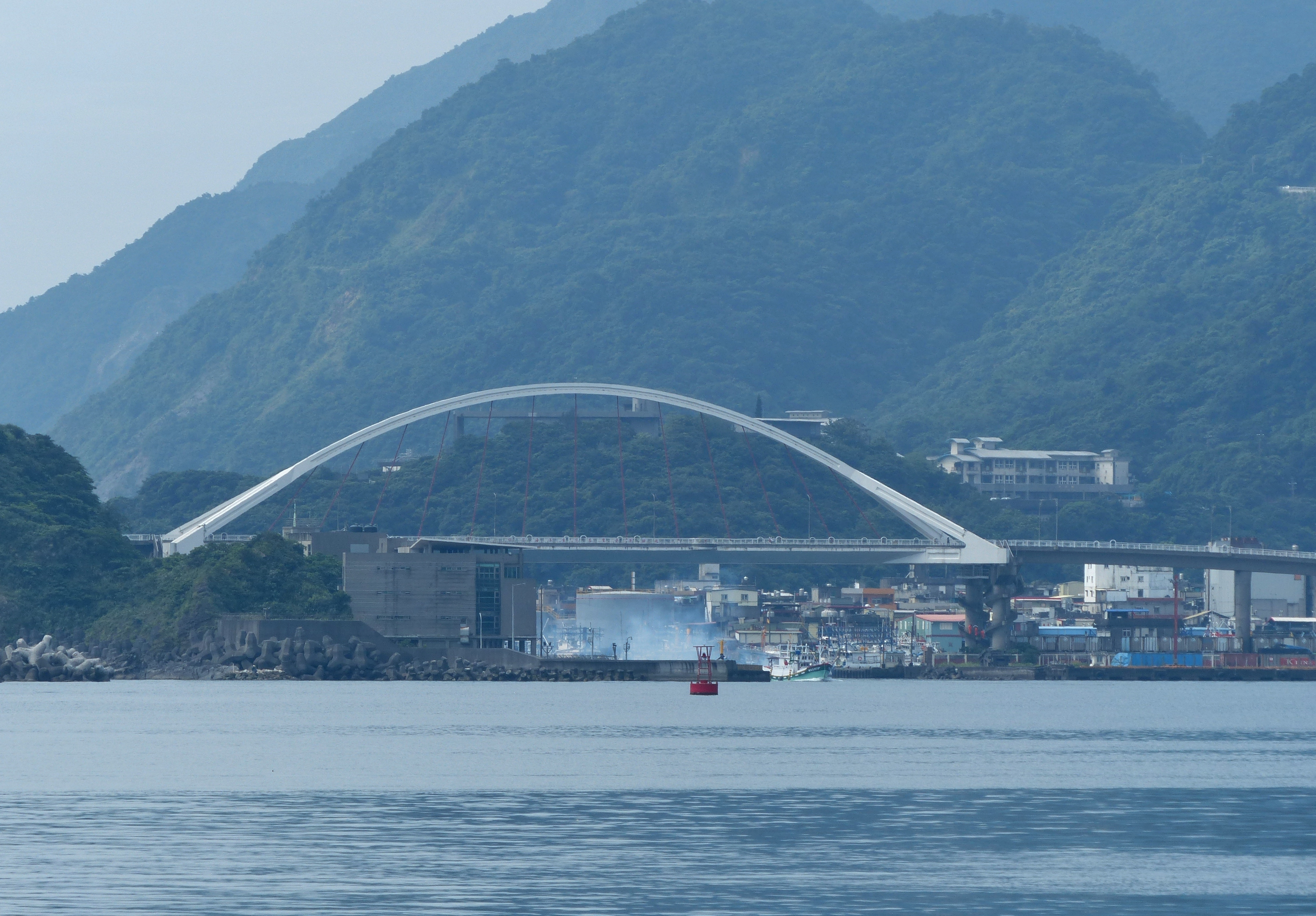
Nanfang'ao Bridge before collapse.

The bridge was designed by MAA Consultants (Chinese: 亞新工程顧問股份有限公司) and built by Yilan County Government. The construction started in 1996 and was commissioned by Ministry of Transportation and Communications. It was finally opened to the public in 1998 and was transferred to Keelung Port Bureau (now Taiwan International Ports Corporation (TIPC)) for its management. The bridge was constructed to replace the former lower bridge around the same area so that large fishing vessels could pass through underneath it.

Since its opening, it was only inspected once by Chien Hsin University of Science and Technology in 2016. During the inspection, it was found that the bridge's expansion joints were "obviously warped, damaged and sagging." From 2017 to 2018, TIPC spent NT$10 million to clean the expansion joints and other reinforcement works.

=== Collapse ===
Bridge collapse
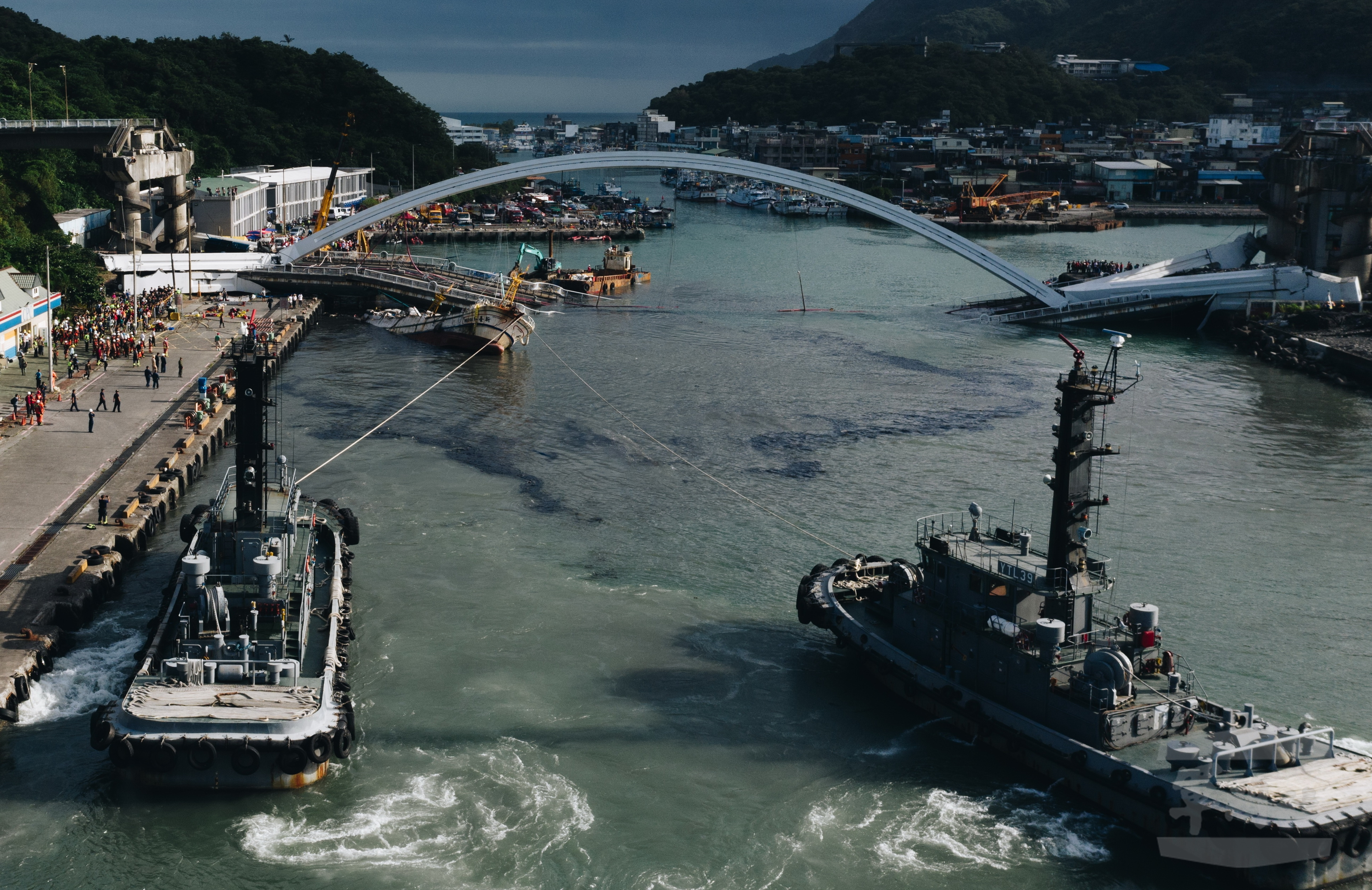
- The collapsed Nanfang'ao Bridge
- Date: 1 October 2019
- Time: 09:30 (UTC+8)
- Location: Su'ao, Yilan County, Taiwan
- Deaths: 6
- Injuries: 12

On 1 October 2019 at 09:30 the bridge collapsed, injuring more than 20 people, many of whom were on fishing vessels in the harbor below. Video shows an oil tanker truck nearly making it across to the other side when the bridge collapsed, sending the truck hurtling into the water, whereupon it burst into flames. There were in total six people on the bridge during the collapse. The collapsing bridge damaged three fishing boats beneath it, injuring and trapping a number of migrant workers who were on the boats.

Local authorities requested the armed forces to help in the search and rescue operation, who were then followed by the Coast Guard Administration, Ministry of National Defense and National Airborne Service Corps. President Tsai Ing-wen said, "We hope to safely rescue all in the shortest time to minimise the damages".

Search and rescue operation teams faced difficulties in finding the missing people due to the underwater location which had low visibility. As of 3 October 2019, there had been six confirmed deaths. All of the bodies had been brought to the Su'ao Branch of Taipei Veterans General Hospital.

The day before the bridge collapsed, the area was hit by Typhoon Mitag, and struck by a 3.8 magnitude earthquake at 01:54 in the early morning before the collapse. However, MAA Consultants were not able to determine the actual cause before the crucial broken parts of the structure have been recovered.

| Nationality | Number of injured | Number of deaths |
|---|---|---|
| Indonesia | 3 | 3 |
| Philippines | 5 | 3 |
| China | 3 | |
| Total | 12 | 6 |

==== Post collapse recovery, investigations and reactions ====
The oil tanker driver, 61-year-old Zhang Jianchang (張建昌), was rescued from the burning wreckage immediately after the collapse by four workers from a nearby petrol station located 30 meters away. Zhang suffered multiple fractures, spinal, and internal injuries. He underwent emergency surgery and was warded in the intensive care unit at the Luodong Bo’ai Hospital. As of 31 October 2019, Zhang was recovering from his injuries.

The armed forces deployed a floating platform to retrieve debris and the boats stuck under the bridge. President Tsai promised a thorough investigation of the incident and that all bridges in Taiwan would undergo inspection.

Most of the arches of the bridge were cleared on 10 October 2019, totaling 320 tonnes.

In November 2020, Taiwan Transportation Safety Board published the final investigation regarding the collapse of the bridge. The findings were that the bridge collapsed due to corrosion, lack of proper maintenance and lack of repair. By the time of the incident, the supporting steel cables had only 22–27% of functional cross-section area left.

In August 2022, the Yilan District Prosecutors' Office charged six people involved in the construction of the bridge with negligence.

==== Aftermath ====
The Ministry of Transportation and Communications stated that a new bridge will be built at the same spot within three years. The design and tender for the new bridge will be overseen by Public Construction Commission.

On 3 October 2019, Premier Su Tseng-chang ordered inspections of all bridges in Taiwan.

Due to the fact that many migrant fishermen sleep inside their fishing vessels during night time, a dangerous condition in the case of similar bridge collapse incident to happen again, the Labor Affairs Department of Yilan County Government started the planning to build onshore accommodation for those migrant workers at Nanfang'ao Fishing Port. The project will be broken down into three phases and last for three years, with the ultimate goal of providing the accommodation for all of the migrant fishermen.

==== New bridge ====
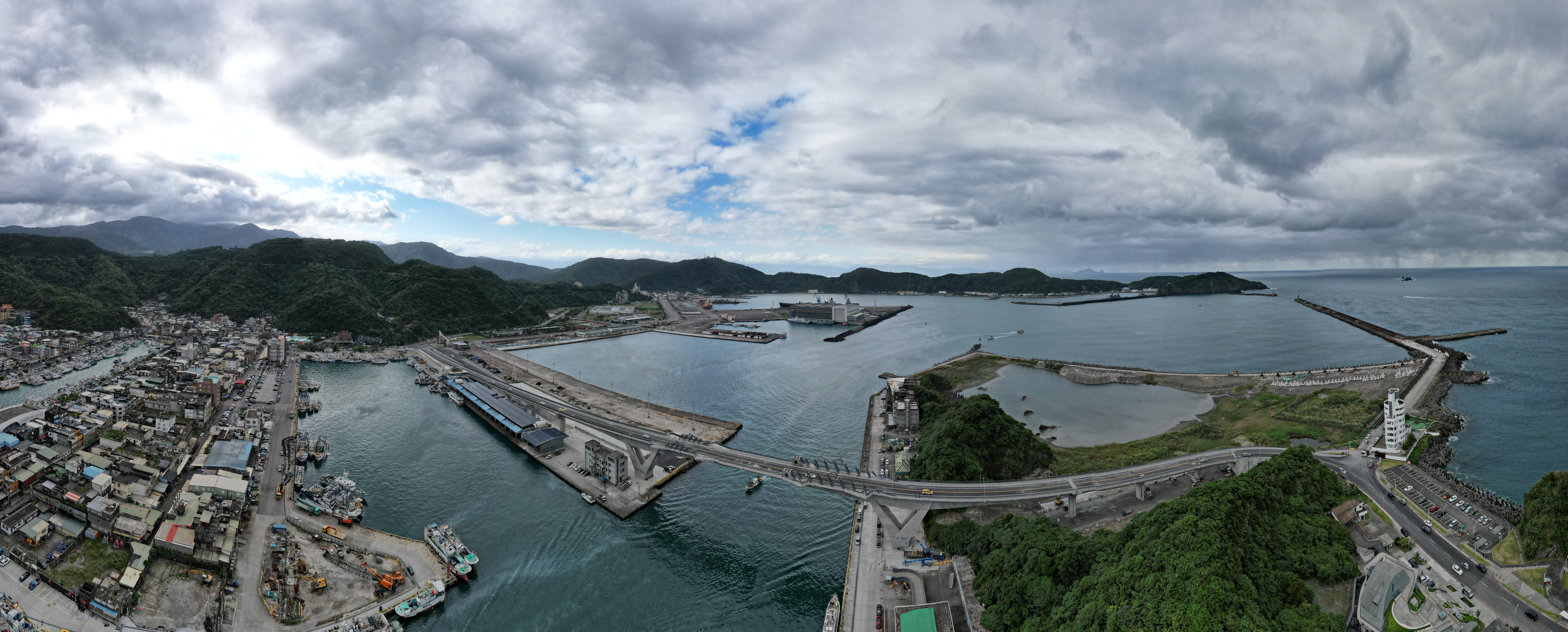
Su'Ao's Nanfangao Aerial Panorama. Shot December 2022

The construction of the new bridge to replace the collapsed one started in October 2020. It is overseen by Directorate General of Highways. The cost of the construction is NT$848.5 million and is completed on 18 December 2022.

== Technical specification ==
The bridge was a single tied-arch bridge made of steel. It had a length of 140 meters (460 ft), a width of 15 meters (49 ft) and a passage height for vessels of 18 meters (59 ft). The bridge was intended to last 50 years.

== Architecture ==
The bridge was decorated with images of fish, shrimps, and crabs, representing the port.

== See also ==
- List of bridge failures
- List of bridges in Taiwan
