= Nantian Temple =

Temple in Nanfang'ao, Yilan County, Taiwan

- 南天宮
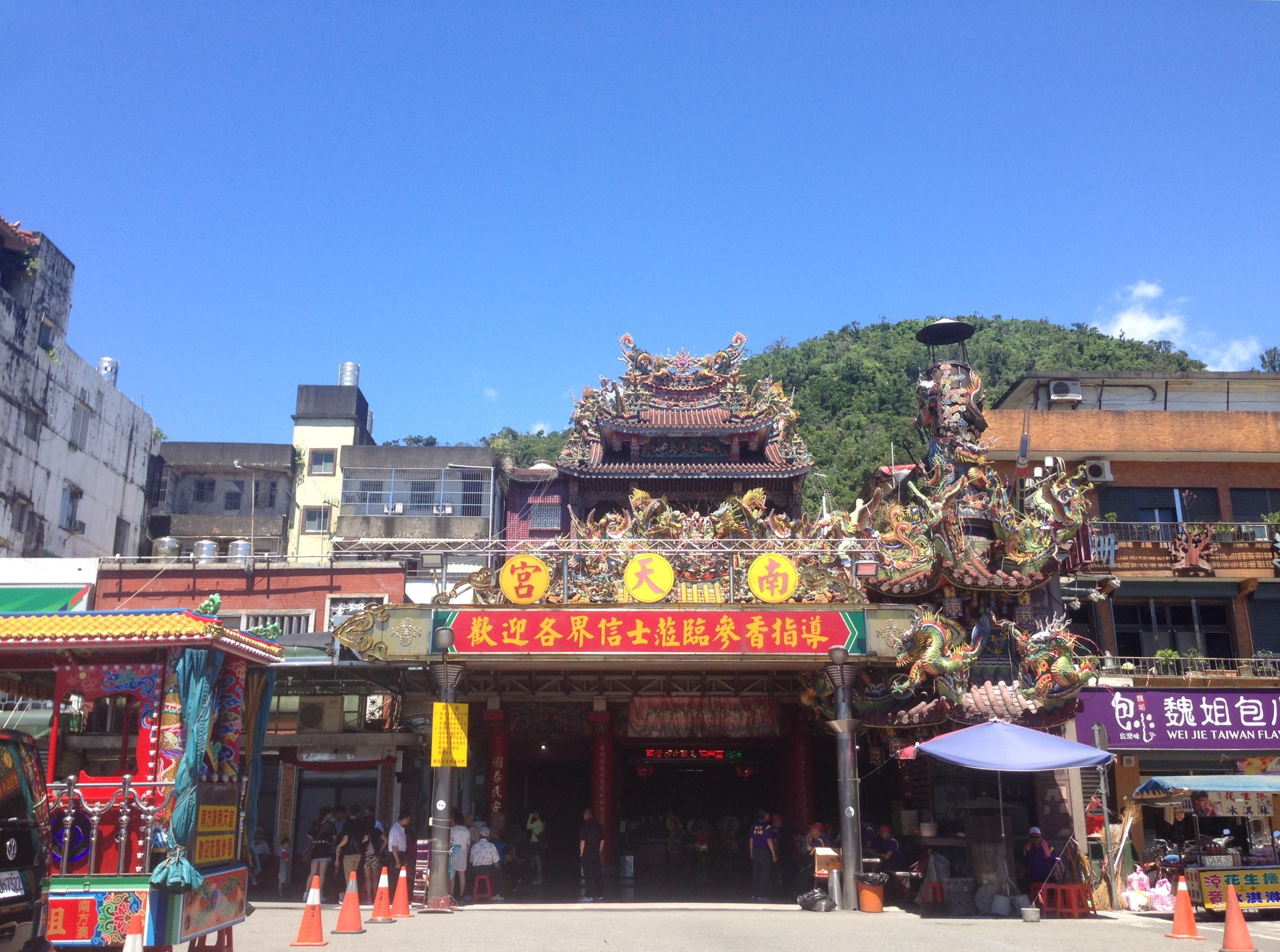
- Temple facade

Location
- Location: Su'ao, Yilan County
- Country: Taiwan
- Interactive map of Nantian Temple
- Coordinates: 24.5818°N 121.8648°E

Architecture
- Completed: 1956
- Direction of façade: East

Nanfang'ao Nantian Temple (Chinese: 南方澳南天宮; pinyin: Nánfāng'ào Nántiān Gōng) is a temple dedicated to the sea goddess Mazu in Nanfang'ao, Su'ao Township, Yilan County, Taiwan.

== History ==
According to local legend, in 1946, fishermen from Nanfang'ao were caught in a major storm at sea. The fishermen prayed to Mazu to save their lives, and the waters suddenly calmed down. Believing that Mazu had shown herself, they returned back to Nanfang'ao and prepared to build a new temple for the goddess. In 1950, the townspeople asked the Mazu in nearby Shao'an Temple to help them choose where to build the temple, and the deity chose a small tract of land in front of the harbor. Construction of the temple was completed on November 18, 1956. Later, the temple was expanded in 1971.

On August 29, 1987, the police searched a fishing boat named "Jinfeng No. 3" (進豐3號) which was docked at Nanfang'ao. On the boat, they found five smuggled statues of Mazu from Meizhou (the birthplace of Mazu) along with other goods from China. The illegal goods were to be destroyed according to the law, but when word got out that statues of deities were to be burned, Nanfang'ao residents petitioned to Vice-President Lee Teng-hui to save the statues, who agreed to preserve them. The statues were officially installed into Nantian Temple's first floor on October 12, 1987.

=== Meizhou pilgrimages ===
In 1987, Jenn Lann Temple in Dajia became the first temple to make a pilgrimage to Meizhou after martial law was lifted in Taiwan. To circumvent Taiwanese restrictions on sailing to China, the convoy stopped at Japan before heading to Meizhou. In 1989, nineteen fishing boats from Nantian Temple sailed directly to Meizhou from Nanfang'ao. The move was highly controversial at the time; when the pilgrims returned, many were arrested, though most were only charged with light sentences.

In 2005, a convoy from Nantian Temple docked at Xiuyu Harbor in Putian, located close to Meizhou Island, without prior approval from the Taiwanese government. The twenty-one boat convoy had been attending an event in Nangan, Lienchiang, close to Mainland China's shores. Temple officials claimed that they sailed there because of malfunctions and to avoid Typhoon Khanun.

== Architecture and statues ==
Nantian Temple is a three-story reinforced concrete building facing Nanfang'ao harbor. The first floor contains the five Mazu statues from Meizhou, the second contains a Mazu statue made of jade, and the third contains a 194 cm (76 in) Mazu statue made of gold.

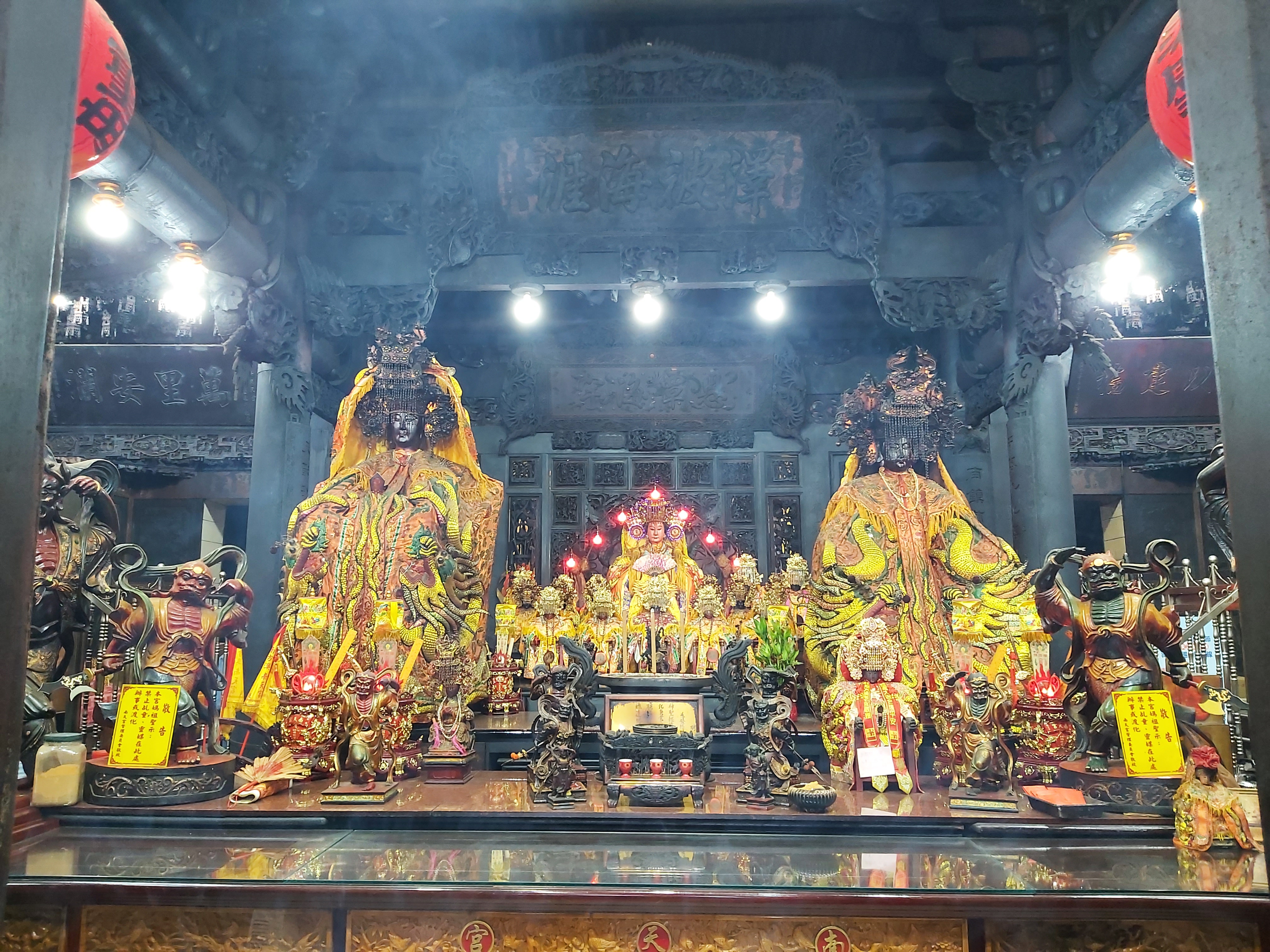
Interior

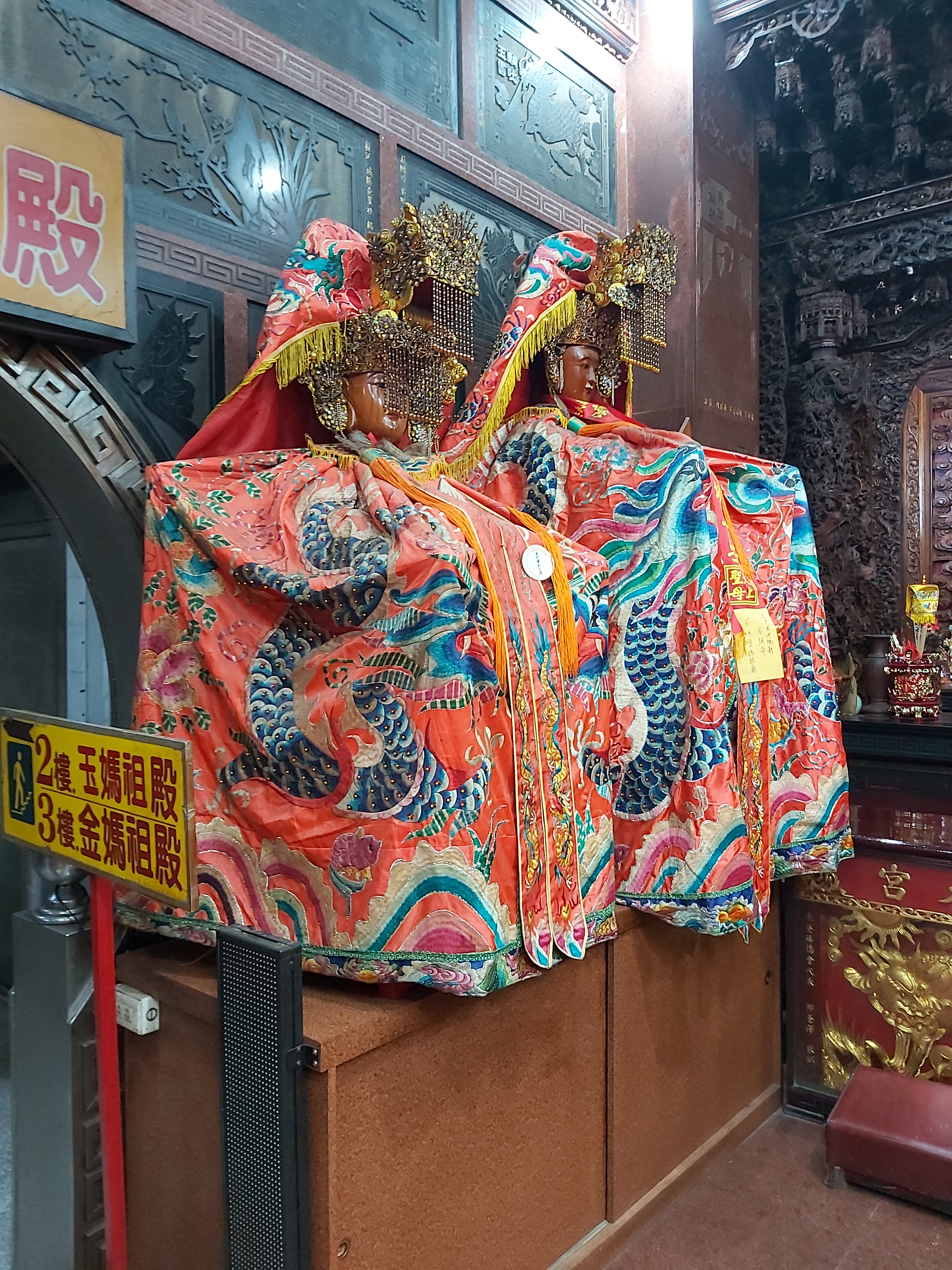
Statues of Mazu

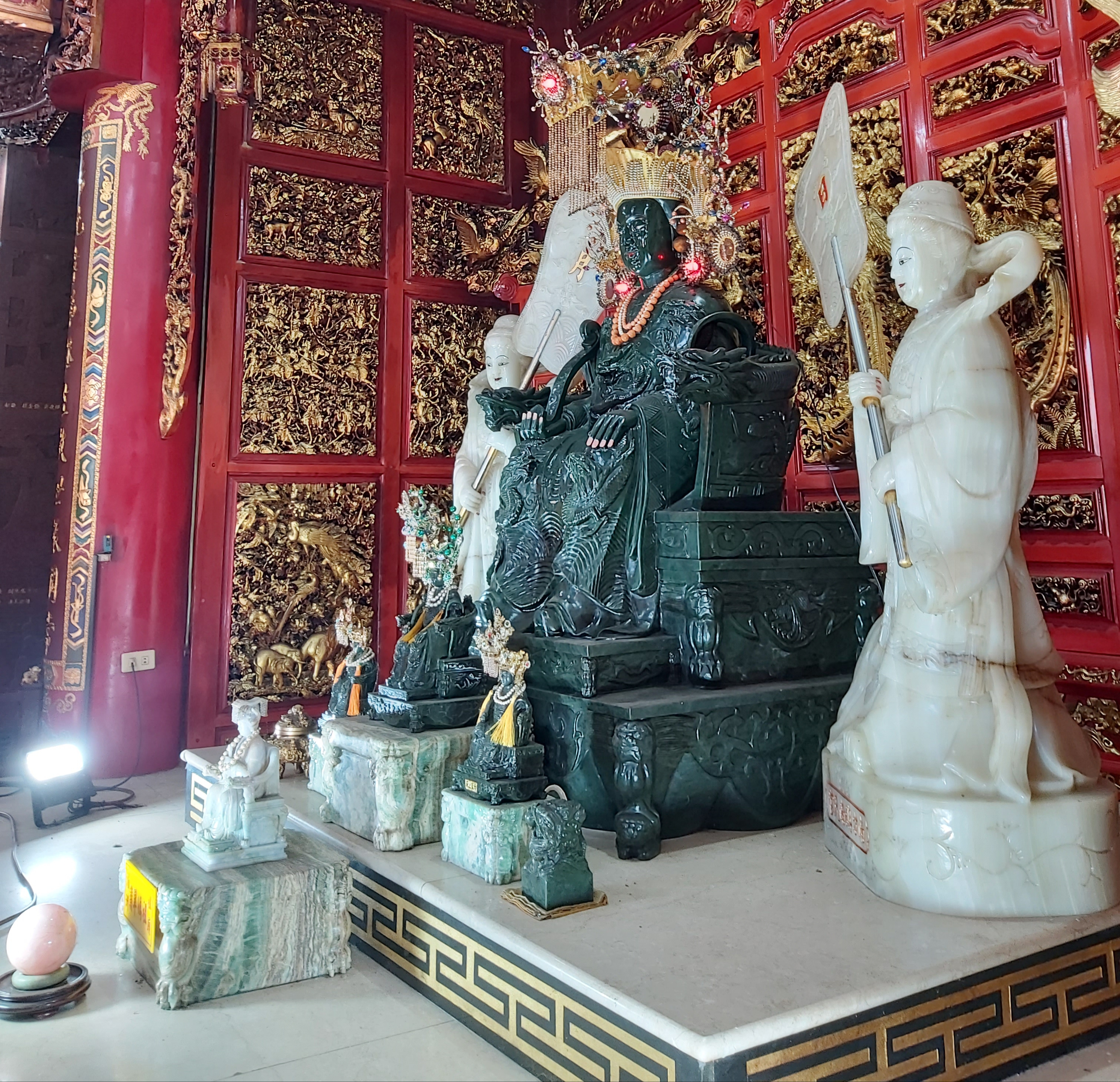
Jade Mazu

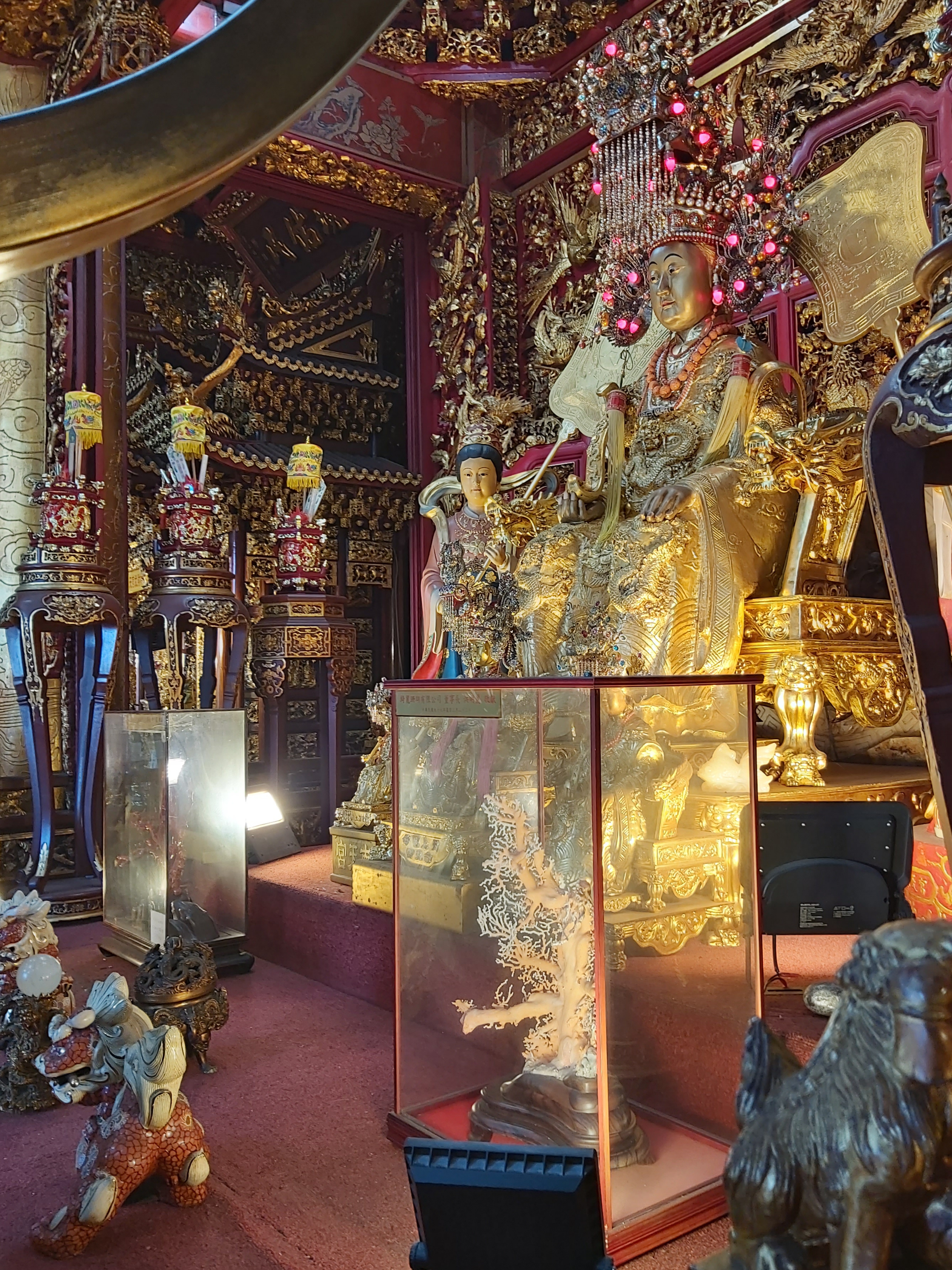
Gold Mazu

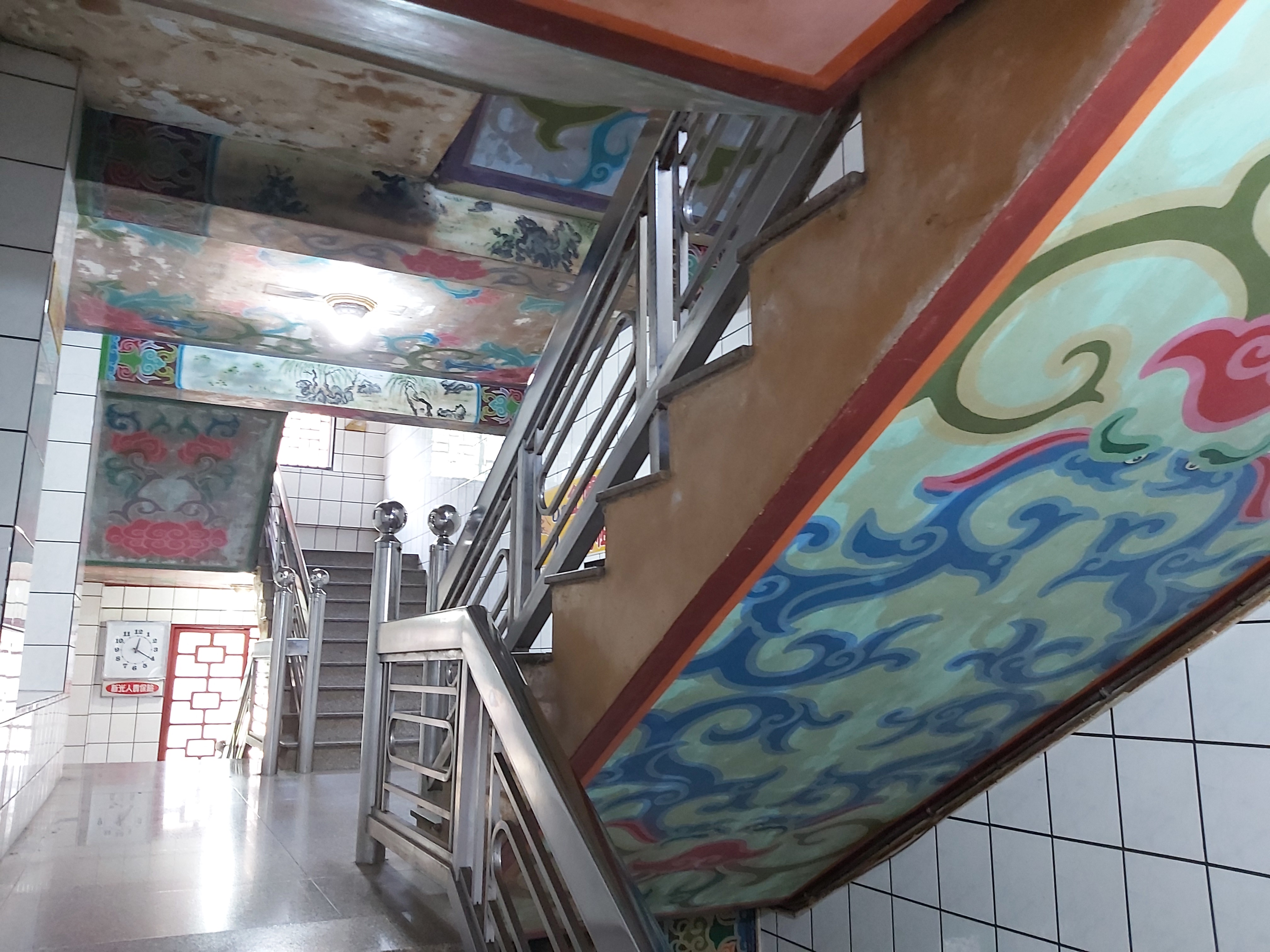
Stairs

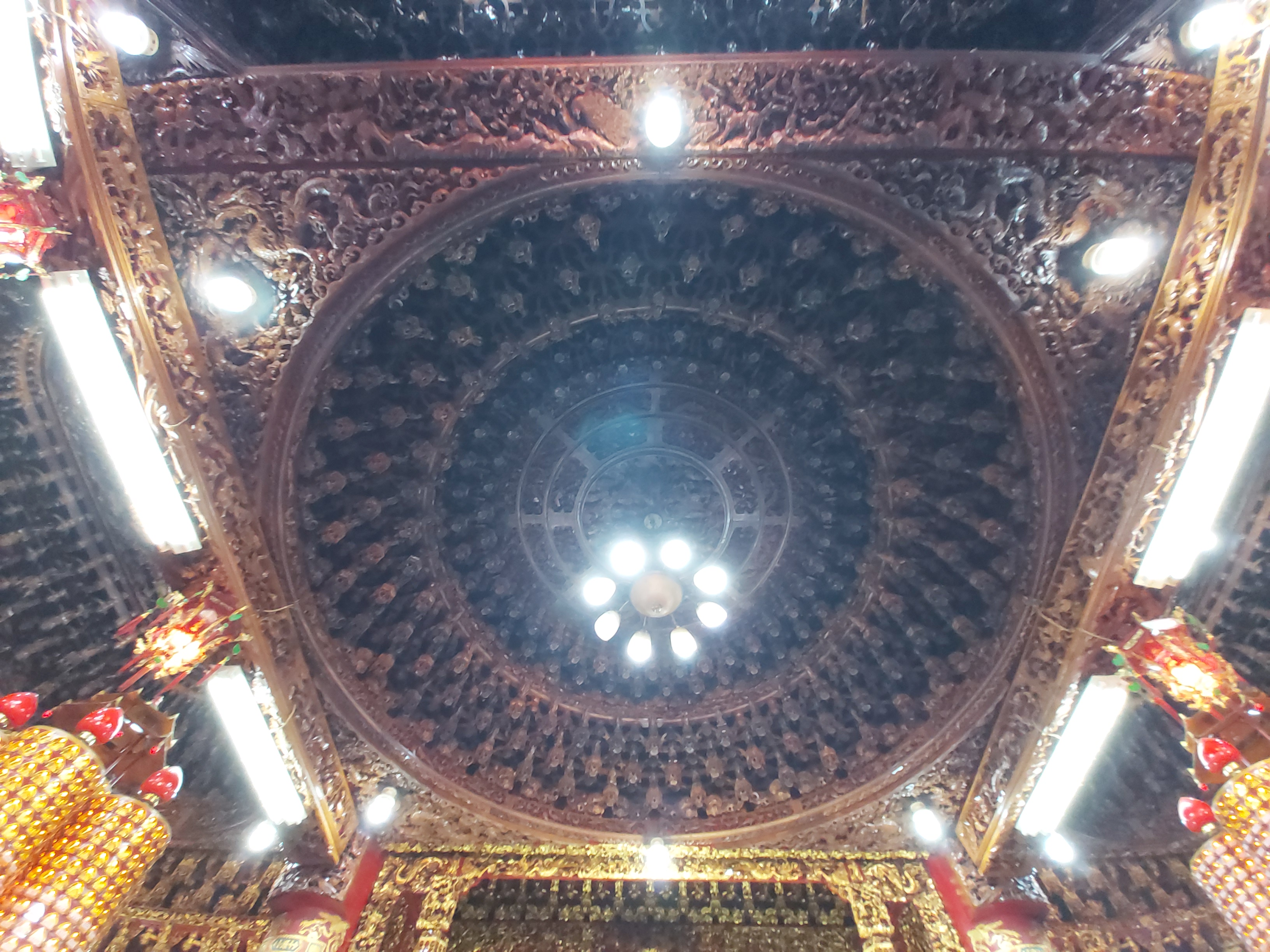
Ceiling

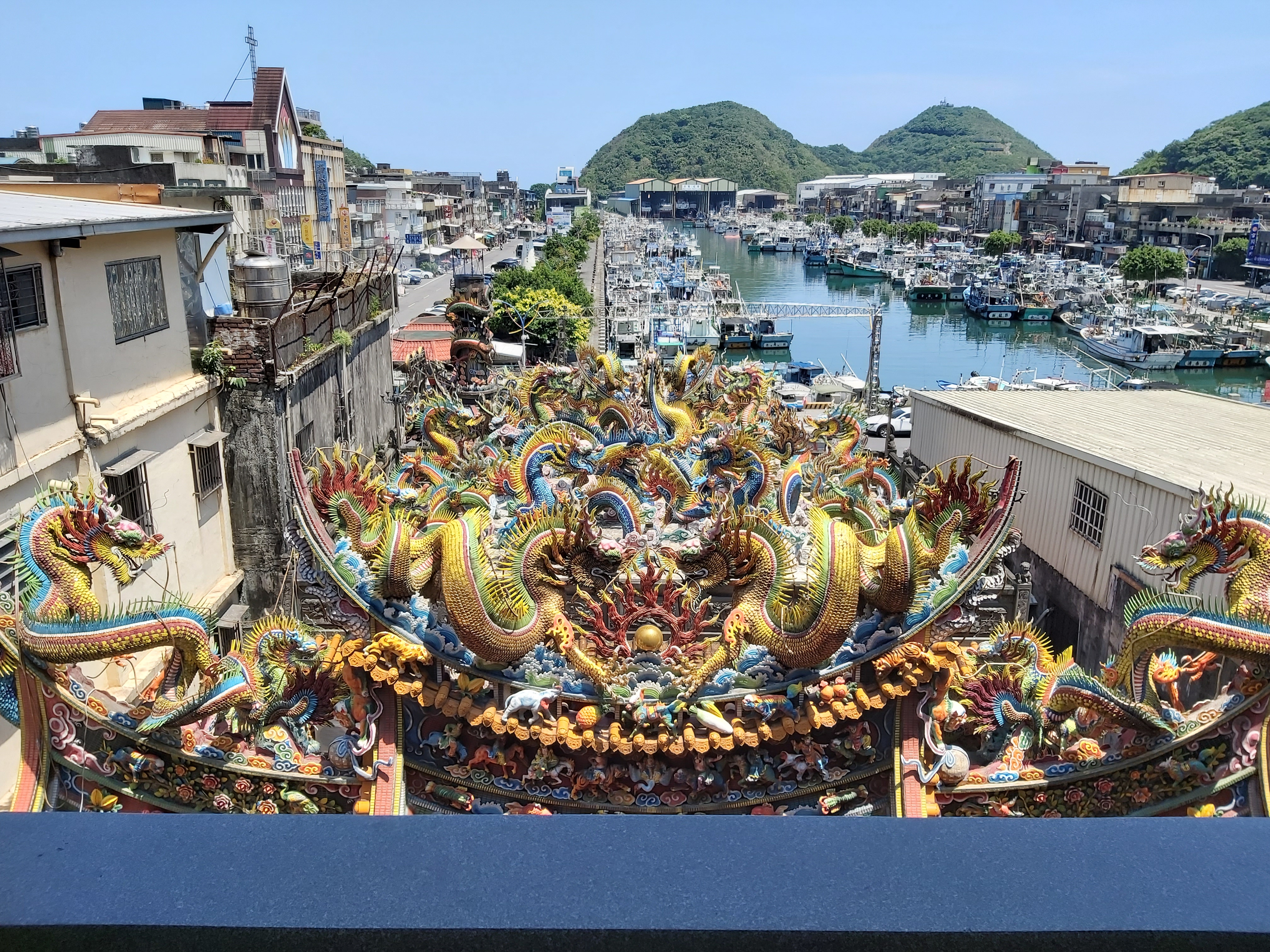
Roof decoration
