= Nanfang'ao Fishing Port =

Fishing port in Su'ao, Yilan County, Taiwan

Nanfang'ao Fishing Port 南方澳漁港
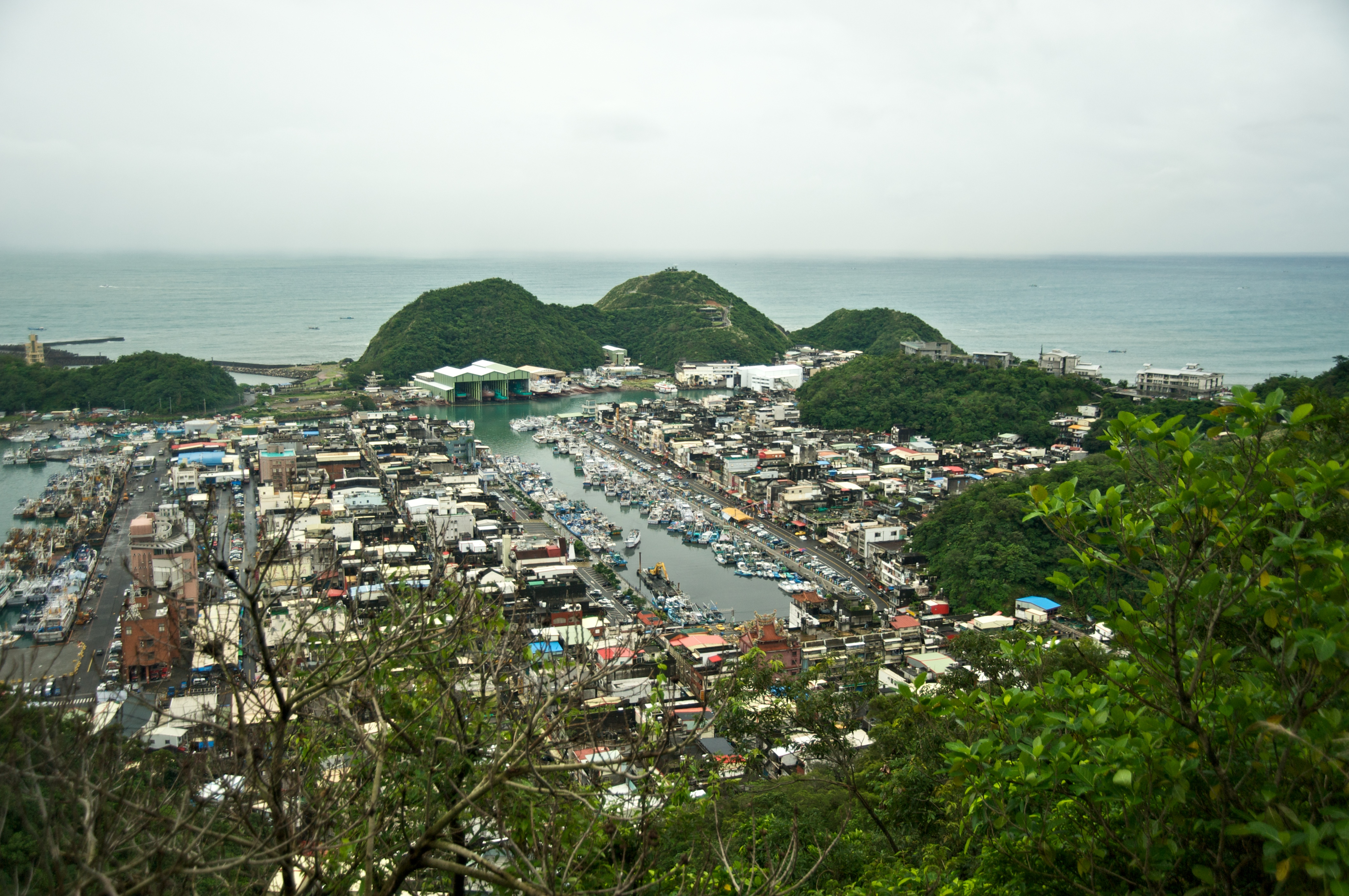
- Interactive map of Nanfang'ao Fishing Port 南方澳漁港
- Location within Taiwan

Location
- Location: Su'ao, Yilan, Taiwan
- Coordinates: 24°35′02″N 121°51′59″E

Details
- Opened: 1923
- Type of Harbor: fishing port

The Nanfang'ao Fishing Port (traditional Chinese: 南方澳漁港; simplified Chinese: 南方澳渔港; pinyin: Nánfāng'ào Yúgǎng) is a fishing harbor in Su'ao Township, Yilan County, Taiwan.

== History ==
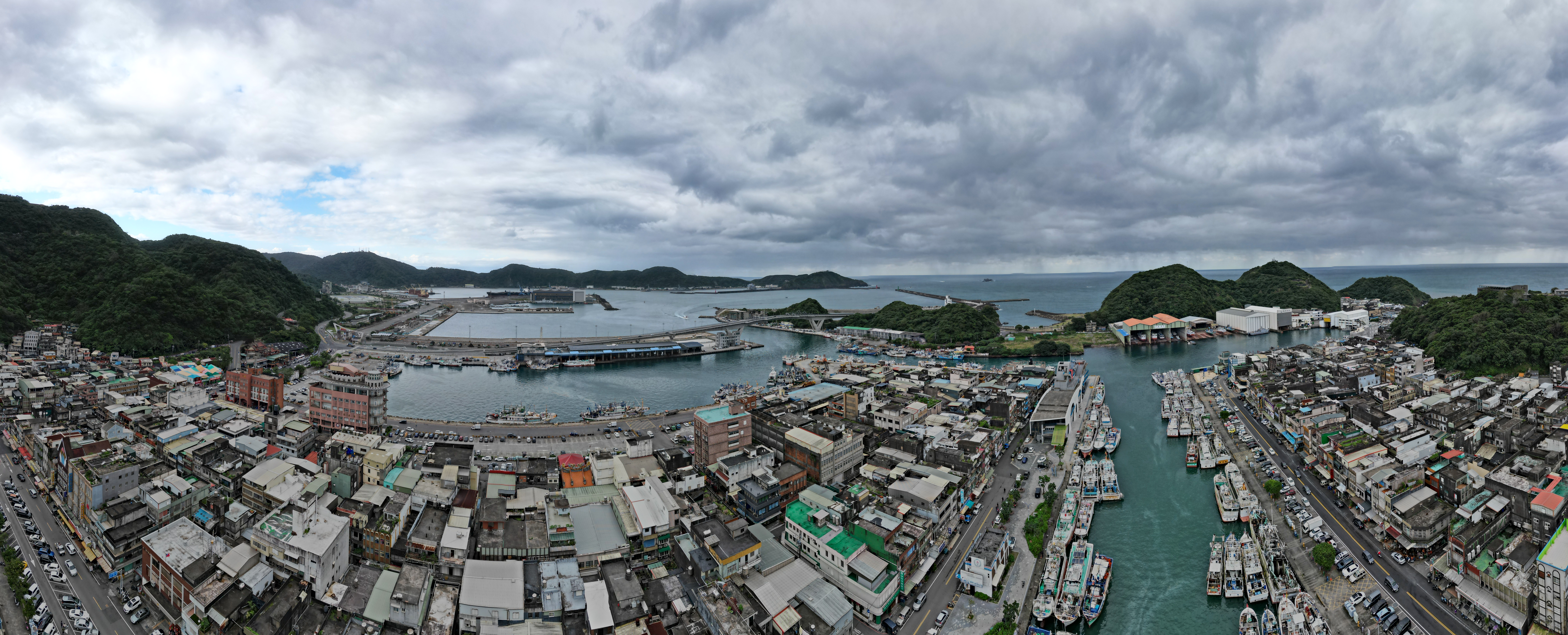
Su'Ao's Nanfangao Port aerial panorama. Shot December 2022.

The port was built in 1923. The port has since been expanded several times.

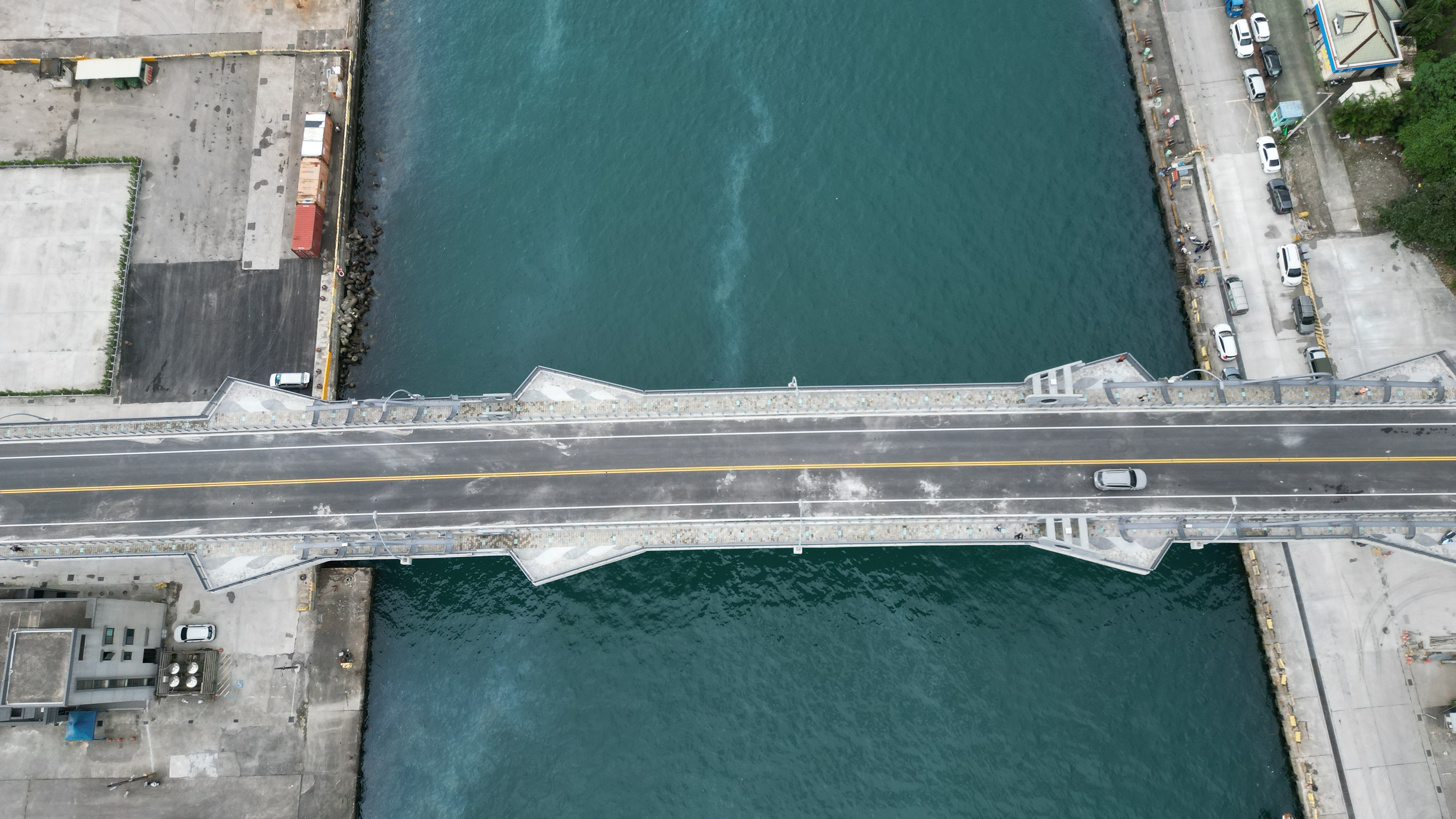
Su'Ao's Nanfangao Bridge. Shot December 2022.

The Nanfang'ao Bridge crossing the harbour entrance fell down on 1 October 2019.

== Produce ==
The port supplies 90% of mackerel demand in Taiwan.

== Tourist attractions ==
- Nanfang'ao Nantian Temple
