= Neiwan =

Neiwan may refer to:

- Neiwan Jianshih, a character voiced by Yukari Anzai in Japanese video games Onsen Musume
- Neiwan line, a railway line of the Taiwan Railways Administration
- Neiwan railway station, a railway station on the Taiwan Railways Administration Neiwan Line
- Neiwan Theater, a movie theater and restaurant
- Neiwan Village (內灣村), Hengshan, Hsinchu County, Taiwan
- Neiwan Village (內灣村), Sanwan, Miaoli County, Taiwan
- Neiwan Village (內灣里), Zhuolan, Miaoli County, Taiwan
