= Zhuzhong railway station =

Railway station located in Hsinchu, Taiwan

Zhuzhong Station 竹中車站
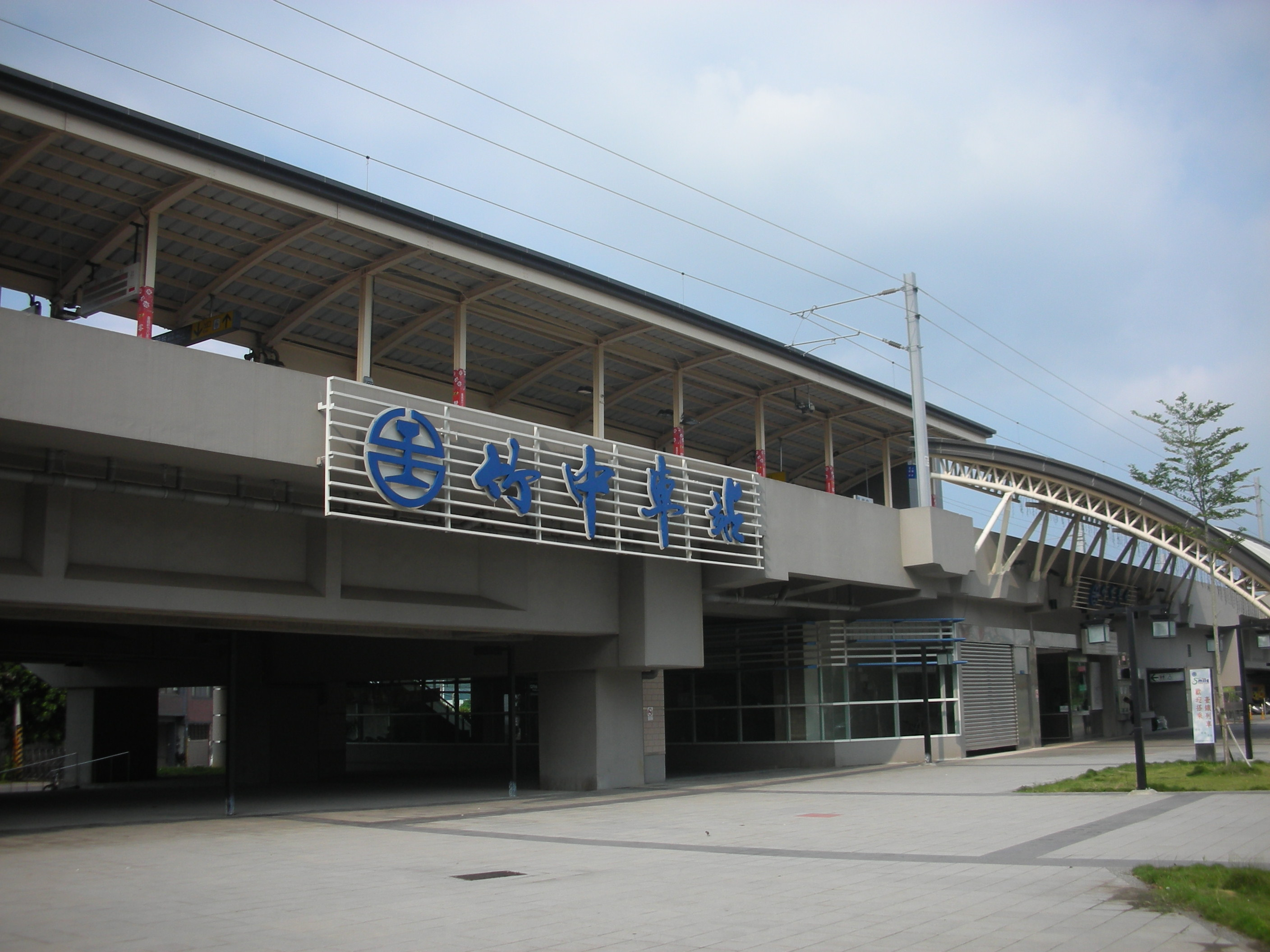
- Station entrance

Chinese name
- Traditional Chinese: 竹中車站
Transcriptions
Standard Mandarin
- Hanyu Pinyin: Zhúzhōng Chēzhàn
- Bopomofo: ㄓㄨˊ ㄓㄨㄥ ㄔㄜ ㄓㄢˋ

General information
- Location: Zhudong, Hsinchu County, Taiwan
- Coordinates: 24°46′52.7″N 121°01′52.4″E
- System: Taiwan Railway railway station
- Lines: Neiwan line Liujia line
- Distance: 7.9 km to Hsinchu; 0.0 km to Zhuzhong
- Platforms: 1 side platform 1 island platform

Construction
- Structure type: Elevated

Other information
- Station code: 241

History
- Opened: 5 November 1947; 11 November 2011

Passengers
- 2017: 241,835 per year
- Rank: 115

Services
Preceding station	Taiwan Railway	Following station
Xinzhuang towards Hsinchu	Neiwan line	Shangyuan towards Neiwan
through to Neiwan line	Liujia line	Liujia Terminus
Location

Zhuzhong railway station (Chinese: 竹中車站; pinyin: Zhúzhōng Chēzhàn) is a railway station located in Zhudong Township, Hsinchu County, Taiwan. It is located on the Neiwan line and Liujia line, and is operated by the Taiwan Railway.

This was formerly an at-grade station. Between March 2007 and November 2011, the station was closed so that the station could be elevated in conjunction with the construction for the Liujia Line.
