= Hengshan railway station =

Railway station located in Hsinchu County, Taiwan

Hengshan Station 橫山車站
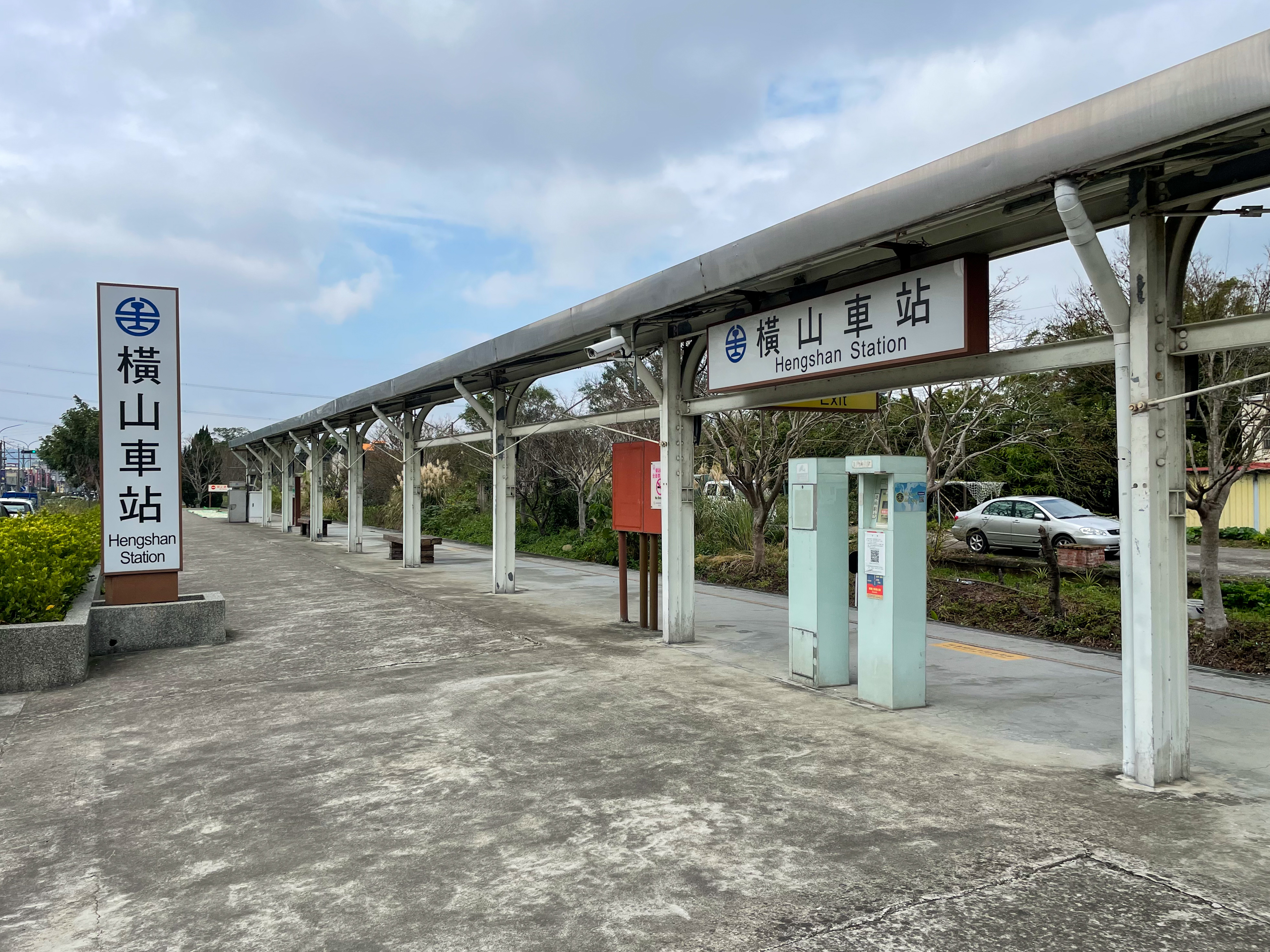

Chinese name
- Traditional Chinese: 橫山車站
- Simplified Chinese: 横山车站
Transcriptions
Standard Mandarin
- Hanyu Pinyin: Héngshān chēzhàn
- Bopomofo: ㄏㄥˊ ㄕㄢ ㄔㄜ ㄓㄢˋ

General information
- Location: Hengshan, Hsinchu County; Taiwan
- Coordinates: 24°43′13.3″N 121°07′03.7″E
- System: TR railway station
- Line: Neiwan line
- Distance: 20.0 km to Hsinchu
- Platforms: 1 side platform

Construction
- Structure type: At-grade

Other information
- Station code: 244

History
- Opened: 27 December 1950

Passengers
- 2017: 40,189 per year
- Rank: 180

Services
Preceding station	Taiwan Railway	Following station
Zhudong towards Hsinchu	Neiwan line	Jiuzantou towards Neiwan
Location

Hengshan railway station (Chinese: 橫山車站; pinyin: Héngshān chēzhàn) is a railway station located in Hengshan, Hsinchu County, Taiwan. It is located on the Neiwan line and is operated by Taiwan Railway.
