= Jiuzantou railway station =

Railway station located in Hsinchu County, Taiwan

Jiuzantou Station 九讚頭車站
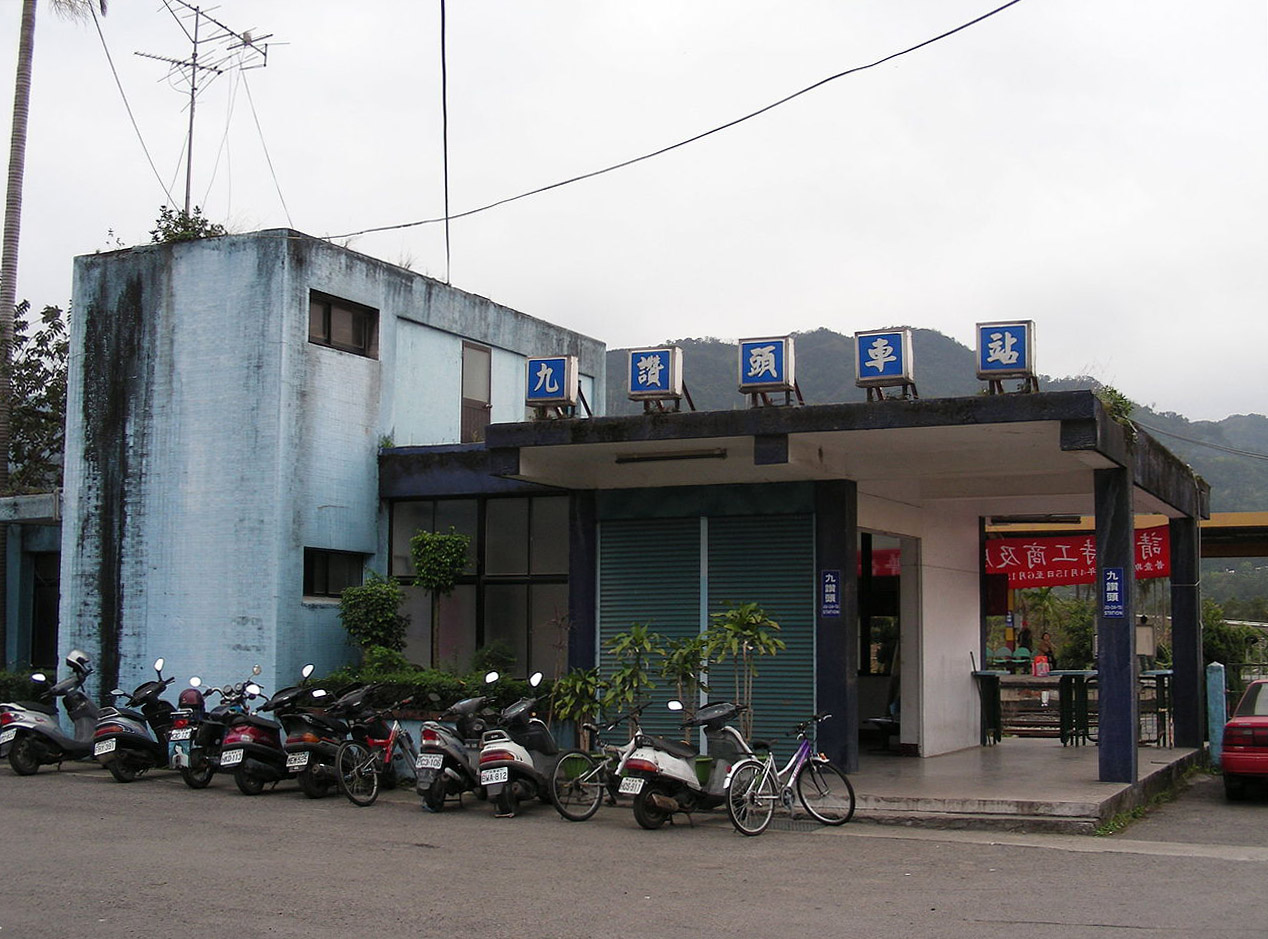

Chinese name
- Traditional Chinese: 九讚頭車站
Transcriptions
Standard Mandarin
- Hanyu Pinyin: Jiǔzàntóu Chēzhàn
- Bopomofo: ㄐㄧㄡˇ ㄗㄢˋ ㄊㄡˊ ㄔㄜ ㄓㄢˋ

General information
- Location: Hengshan, Hsinchu County; Taiwan
- Coordinates: 24°43′14.2″N 121°08′10.3″E
- System: Taiwan Railway railway station
- Line: Neiwan line
- Distance: 22.2 km to Hsinchu
- Platforms: 1 island platform

Construction
- Structure type: At-grade

Other information
- Station code: 245

History
- Opened: 27 December 1950

Passengers
- 2017: 18,831 per year
- Rank: 192

Services
Preceding station	Taiwan Railway	Following station
Hengshan towards Hsinchu	Neiwan line	Hexing towards Neiwan
Location

Jiuzantou railway station (Chinese: 九讚頭車站; pinyin: Jiǔzàntóu Chēzhàn) is a railway station located in Hengshan, Hsinchu County, Taiwan. It is located on the Neiwan line and is operated by the Taiwan Railway.
