= Hexing railway station =

Railway station located in Hsinchu County, Taiwan

Hexing Station 合興車站
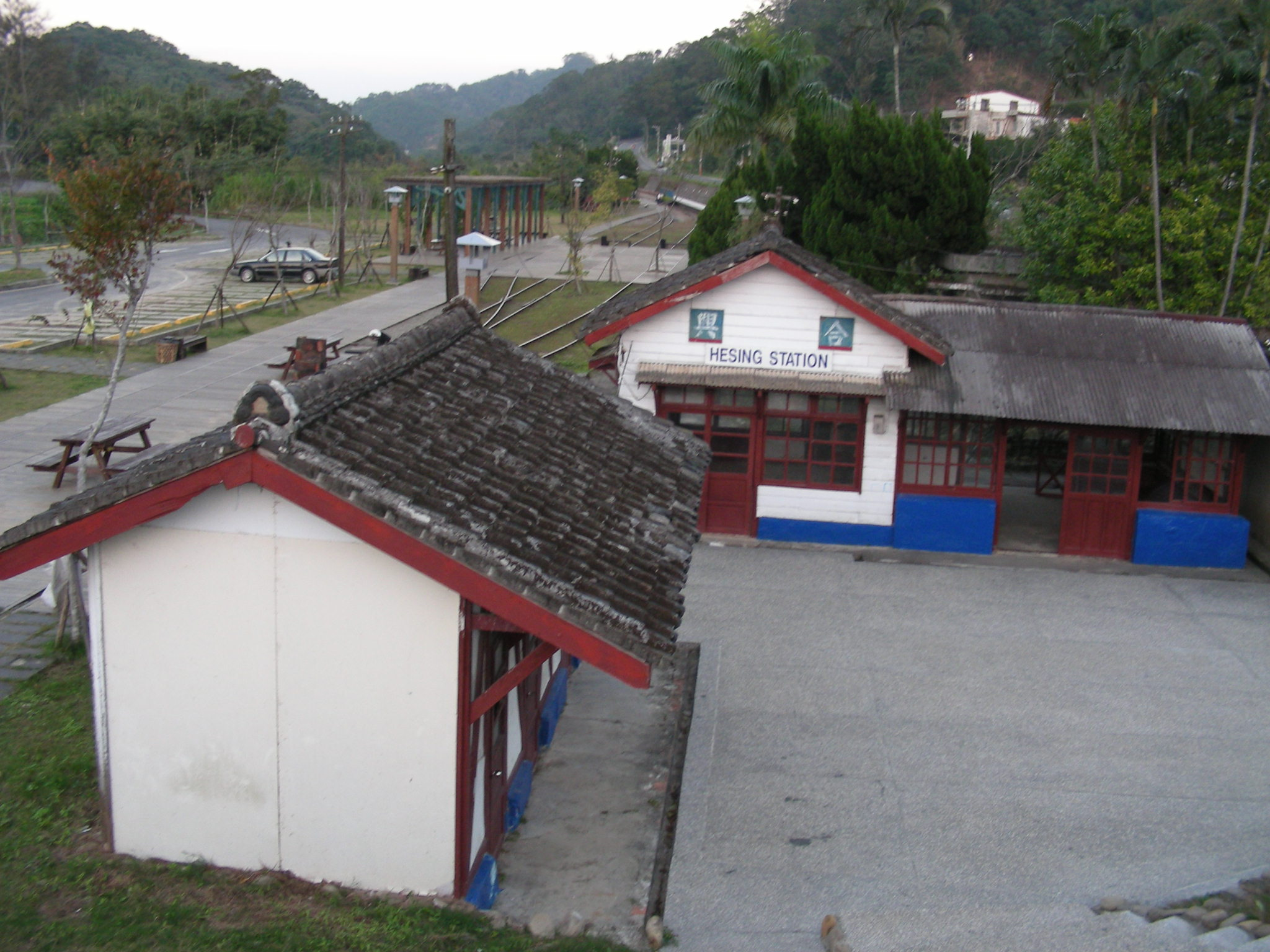

Chinese name
- Traditional Chinese: 合興車站
Transcriptions
Standard Mandarin
- Hanyu Pinyin: Héxīng Chēzhàn
- Bopomofo: ㄏㄜˊ ㄒㄧㄥ ㄊㄡˊ ㄔㄜ ㄓㄢˋ

General information
- Location: Hengshan, Hsinchu County; Taiwan
- Coordinates: 24°42′59.6″N 121°09′16.4″E
- System: TRA railway station
- Line: Neiwan line
- Distance: 24.4 km to Hsinchu
- Platforms: 1 side platform

Construction
- Structure type: At-grade

Other information
- Station code: 246

History
- Opened: 27 December 1950

Passengers
- 2017: 41,463 per year
- Rank: 176

Services
Preceding station	Taiwan Railway	Following station
Jiuzantou towards Hsinchu	Neiwan line	Fugui towards Neiwan
Location

Hexing railway station (Chinese: 合興車站; pinyin: Héxīng Chēzhàn) is a railway station located in Hengshan, Hsinchu County, Taiwan. It is located on the Neiwan line and is operated by the Taiwan Railway.
