= Xinzhuang railway station (Taiwan) =

Railway station located in Hsinchu City, Taiwan

Xinzhuang Station 新莊車站
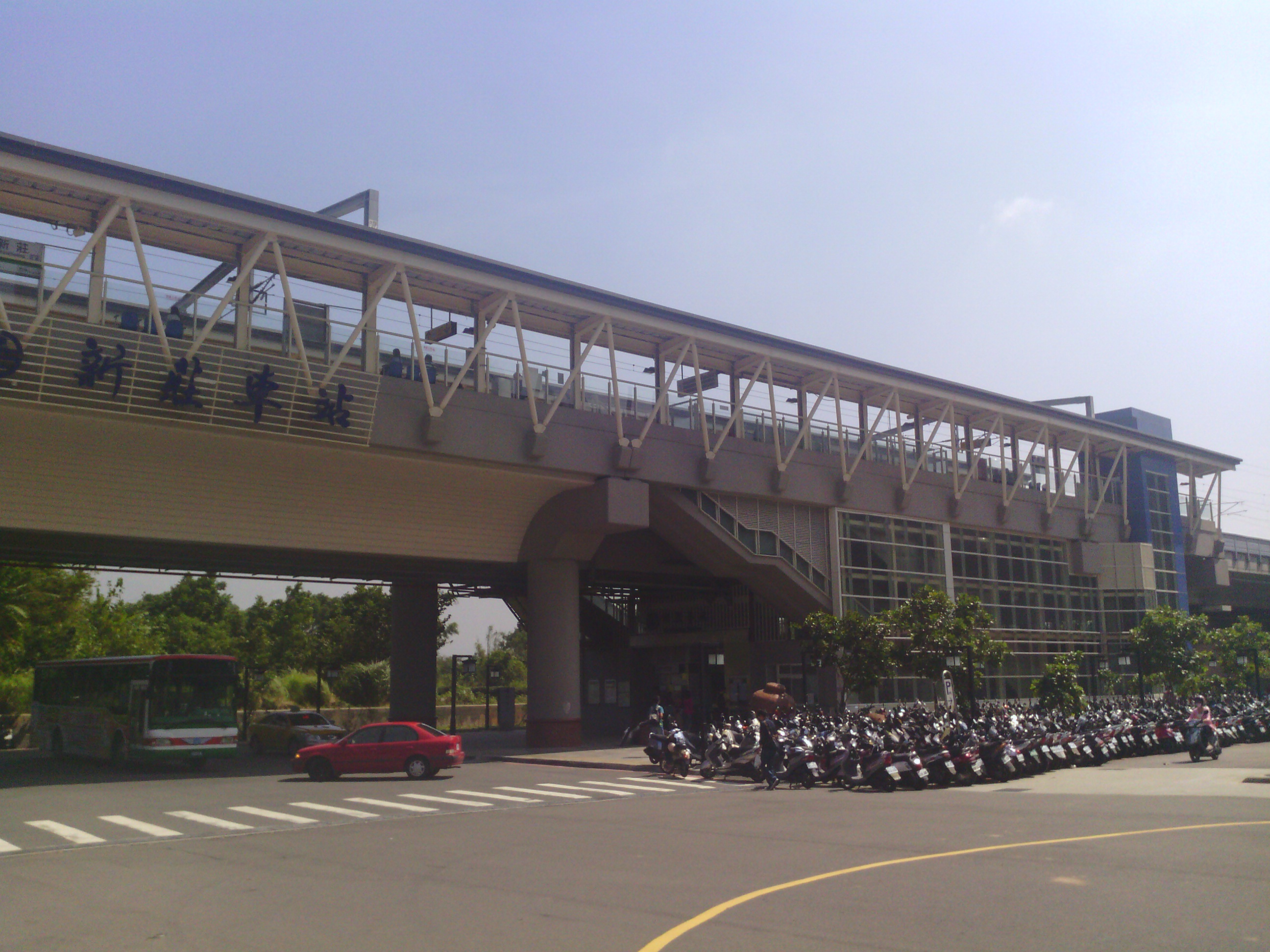
- Station entrance

Chinese name
- Traditional Chinese: 新莊車站
Transcriptions
Standard Mandarin
- Hanyu Pinyin: Xīnzhuāng Chēzhàn
- Bopomofo: ㄒㄧㄣ ㄓㄨㄤ ㄔㄜ ㄓㄢˋ

General information
- Location: East District, Hsinchu; Taiwan
- Coordinates: 24°47′17.4″N 121°01′18.1″E
- System: Taiwan Railway railway station
- Line: Neiwan line
- Distance: 6.6 km to Hsinchu
- Platforms: 2 side platforms

Construction
- Structure type: Elevated

Other information
- Station code: 239

History
- Opened: 11 November 2011
- Former names: Guandong railway station Zhuke railway station

Passengers
- 2017: 607,514 per year
- Rank: 73

Services
Preceding station	Taiwan Railway	Following station
Qianjia towards Hsinchu	Neiwan line	Zhuzhong towards Neiwan
Location

Xinzhuang railway station (Chinese: 新莊車站; pinyin: Xīnzhuāng Chēzhàn) is a railway station located in East District, Hsinchu City, Taiwan. It is located on the Neiwan line and is operated by Taiwan Railway.

When the station opened in 2011, it was named Zhuke railway station (Chinese: 竹科車站; pinyin: Zhúkē Chēzhàn), after the Hsinchu Science Park. However, the name was met with controversy from locals, who wanted the station name to reflect local culture. The name was changed to Xinzhuang in January 2013.
