= Qianjia railway station =

Railway station located in Hsinchu City, Taiwan

Qianjia Station 千甲車站
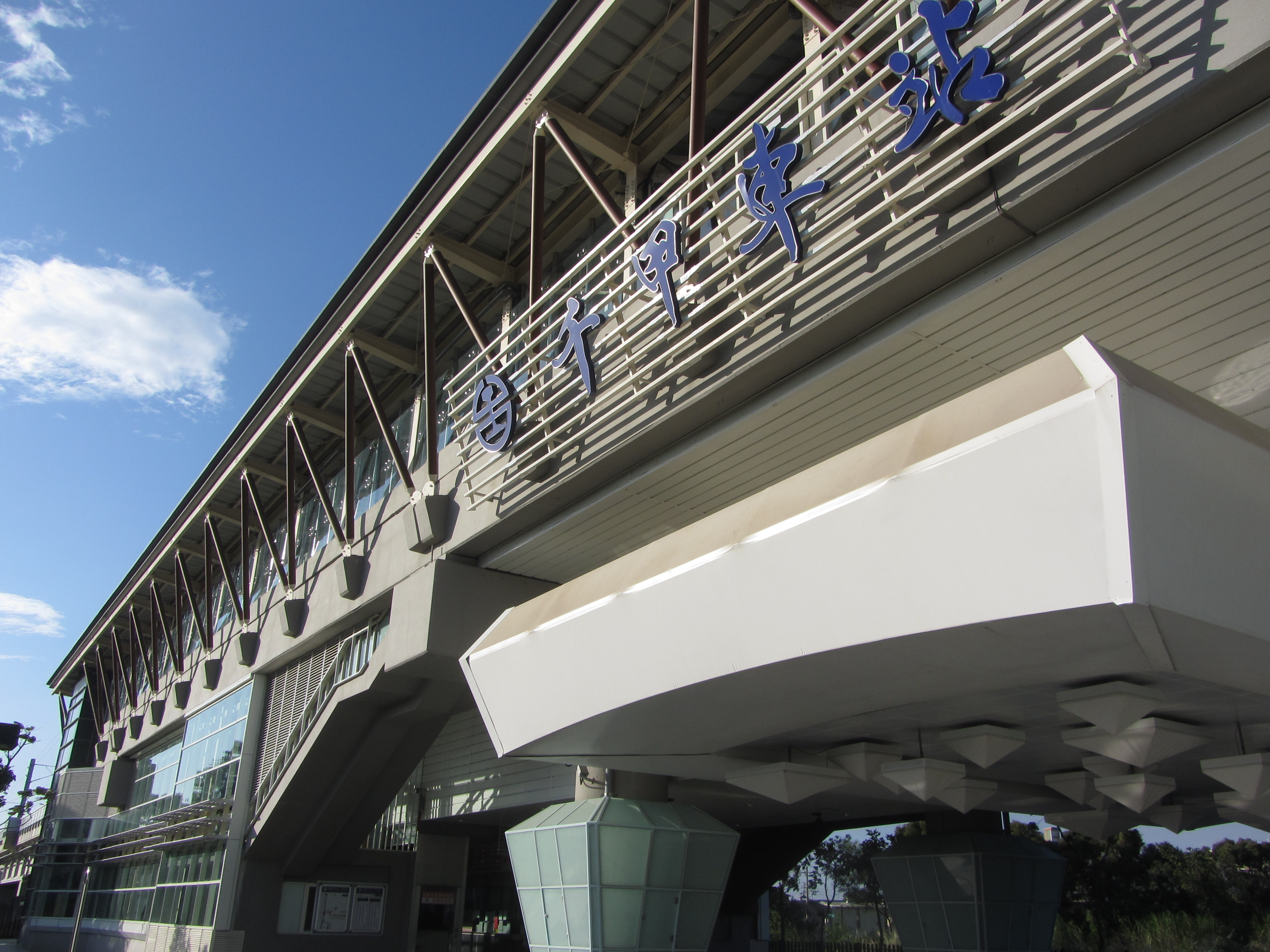

Chinese name
- Traditional Chinese: 千甲車站
Transcriptions
Standard Mandarin
- Hanyu Pinyin: Qiānjiǎ Chēzhàn
- Bopomofo: ㄑㄧㄢ ㄐㄧㄚˇ ㄔㄜ ㄓㄢˋ

General information
- Location: East, Hsinchu City; Taiwan
- Coordinates: 24°48′24.2″N 121°00′11.5″E
- System: Taiwan Railway railway station
- Line: Neiwan line
- Distance: 3.6 km to Hsinchu
- Platforms: 2 side platforms

Construction
- Structure type: Elevated

Other information
- Station code: 238

History
- Opened: 11 November 2011
- Former names: Shibo railway station

Passengers
- 2017: 111,589 per year
- Rank: 147

Services
Preceding station	Taiwan Railway	Following station
North Hsinchu towards Hsinchu	Neiwan line	Xinzhuang towards Neiwan
Location

Qianjia railway station (Chinese: 千甲車站; pinyin: Qiānjiǎ Chēzhàn) is a railway station located in East District, Hsinchu City, Taiwan. It is located on the Neiwan line and is operated by the Taiwan Railway.

When the station opened in 2011, it was named Shibo railway station (Chinese: 世博車站; pinyin: Shìbó Chēzhàn; lit. 'Expo railway station'), after the Taiwanese pavilion from the Expo 2010 that was relocated nearby. However, the name was met with controversy from locals, who wanted the station name to reflect local culture. The name was changed to Qianjia in January 2013. The pavilion, which was turned into a shopping mall, closed on June 30, 2016.
