= Auspicious train ticket =

Railway tickets believed to be lucky

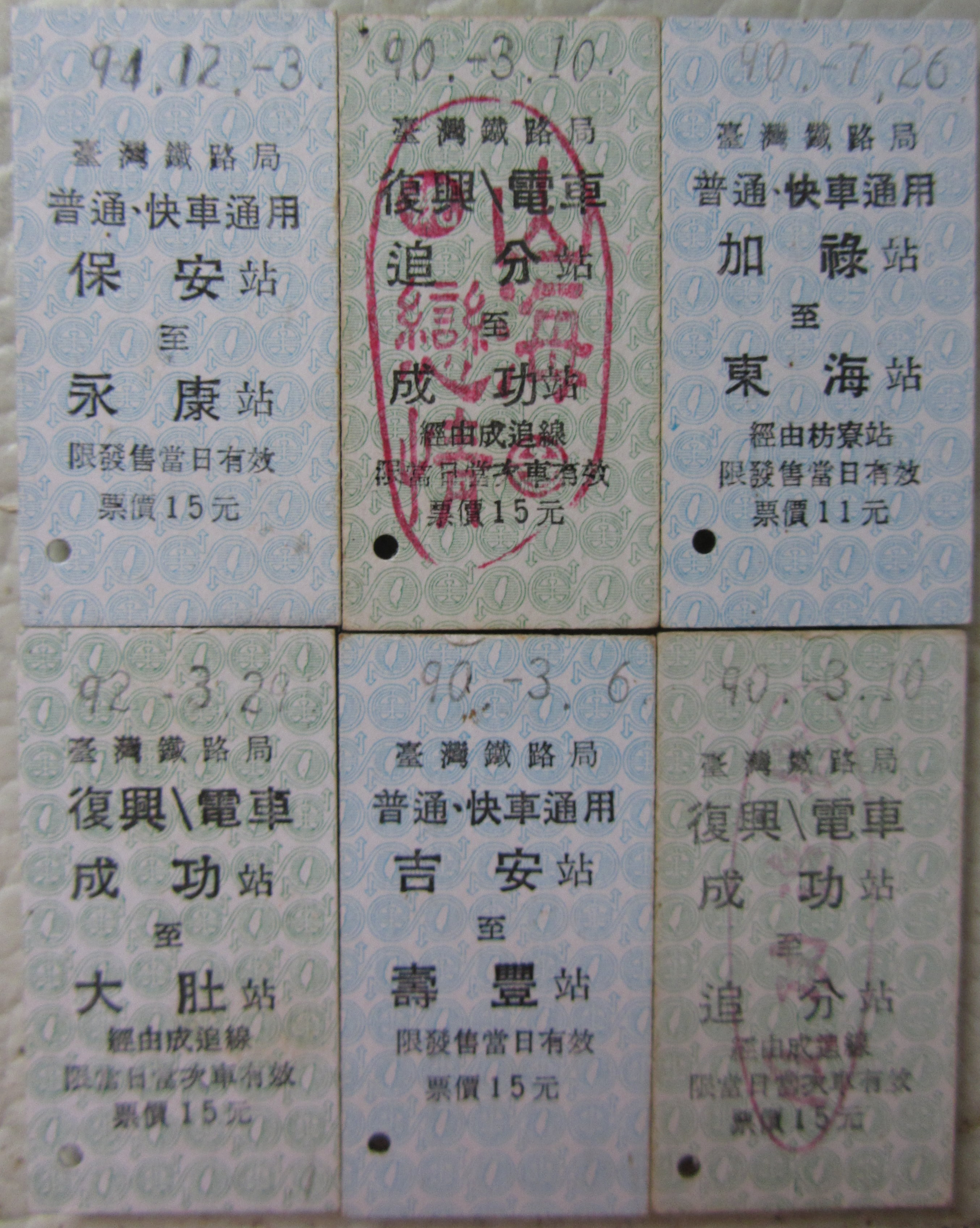
Examples of auspicious train tickets in Taiwan. The station names are read in a way that carries lucky meanings.

Auspicious train tickets (Chinese: 吉祥語車票; pinyin: Jíxiángyǔ Chēpiào) refer to train tickets with auspicious messages on them derived from the beginning and end stations on the ticket. Messages often employ homophonic puns in both Mandarin and Hokkien and shuffling the order of characters to reach the desired effect. In Taiwan, the Edmondson tickets are sought by collectors and people wishing for good luck.

== History ==
In 1973, an NHK television show in Obihiro, Hokkaido, Japan reported that tickets from Kōfuku Station and Aikoku Station carried an auspicious meaning. The kanji of the two characters could be interpreted as "happiness" and "country of love", respectively. The two stations then saw a surge of tourists seeking the tickets.

In 1993, after preservation work was completed at Bao'an railway station, the Taiwan Railways Administration (TRA) sought to promote the historic station for tourism. Railway researcher Ming-xun Hsieh (Chinese: 謝明勳) proposed that the TRA sell special edition tickets from Yongkang railway station. Hsieh was inspired by the Kōfuku–Aikoku ticket's success in attracting visitors and believed the same strategy would work in Taiwan as well. The ticket's characters, when read in a clockwise fashion, read "Yongbao Ankang" (永保安康), which meant "peace and health forever." The ticket became an unexpected hit and started the practice of collecting auspicious train tickets.

The Yongbao Ankang tickets saw a surge of popularity on 9 September 2010. Tickets in Taiwan are printed with the date and time when entering the station. Since the year 2010 is year 99 on the Minguo calendar, the printed "99-09-09" was seen as especially auspicious since nine (九) is pronounced the same way as (久; jiǔ; kiú), the character for "long time". The limited edition tickets, which were printed on thicker paper, sold out very quickly.

== Types ==
| Name | | Stations | Literal meaning | Notes |
|---|---|---|---|---|
| 永保安康 | Yǒngbǎo Ānkāng | Yongkang–Bao'an | Peace and health forever | Read in a counter-clockwise manner. |
| 追分成功 | Zhuīfēn Chénggōng | Zhuifen–Chenggong | Acquire points successfully | Given to students about to take a high school or university entrance exam. |
| 大肚成功 | Dàdù Chénggōng | Dadu–Chenggong | Big belly successfully | Refers to a successful pregnancy. |
| 成功歸來 | Chénggōng Guīlái | Chenggong–Guilai | Return successfully | Given to males serving in Taiwan's mandatory military service. |
| 林北台大 | Línběi Táidà | Dalin–Taipei | Your father is from National Taiwan University | Read in a clockwise manner. In Hokkien, "your father" refers to oneself from a higher position, while National Taiwan University (NTU) is regarded as the best university in Taiwan. |
| 慶中台大 | Qìngzhòng Táidà | Daqing–Taichung | Celebrating getting into National Taiwan University | Read in a clockwise manner. |
| 吉安壽豐 | Jíān Shòufēng | Ji'an–Shoufeng | Luck, peace, longevity, and abundance | All four characters considered auspicious. |
| 加祿東海 | Jiālù Dōnghǎi | Jialu–Donghai | Rising salary, East Sea | Shortened form of 加官晉祿、福如東海 ("rising rank and increasing salary, fortune as vast as the East Sea"). |
| 榮華富貴 | Rónghuá Fùguì | Ronghua–Fugui | Wealth and honor | In 2003, the Taiwan Railway Administration renamed Nanhe station to Fugui station in order to pair it with Ronghua station in a manner similar to "Yongbao Ankang". |
