= North Hsinchu railway station =

Railway station in Hsinchu, Taiwan

North Hsinchu Station 北新竹車站
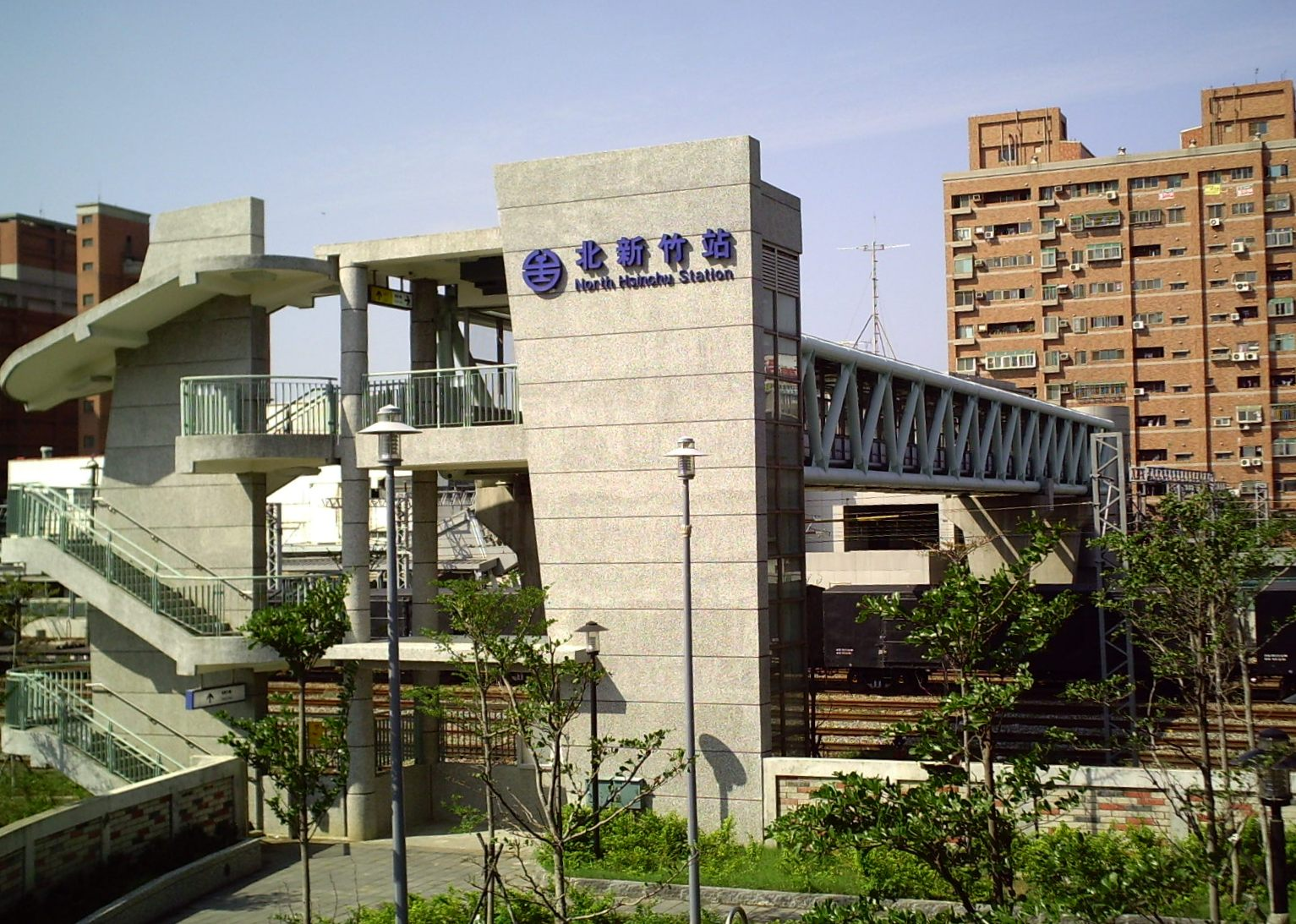

General information
- Location: East, Hsinchu City, Taiwan
- Coordinates: 24°48′31.0″N 120°59′01.6″E
- System: Train station
- Owner: Taiwan Railway Corporation
- Operator: Taiwan Railway Corporation
- Lines: Western Trunk line Neiwan line
- Train operators: Taiwan Railway Corporation

History
- Opened: 1 November 2011

Passengers
- 5,649 daily (2024)

Services
Preceding station	Taiwan Railway	Following station
Zhubei towards Keelung	Western Trunk line	Hsinchu towards Kaohsiung
Hsinchu Terminus	Neiwan line	Qianjia towards Neiwan
Location

North Hsinchu (traditional Chinese: 北新竹車站; simplified Chinese: 北新竹车站; pinyin: Běi Xīnzhú Chēzhàn) is a railway station on Taiwan Railway West Coast line and Neiwan line located in East District, Hsinchu City, Taiwan.

== History ==
The station was opened on 11 November 2011.

== Around the station ==
- Aqueduct Museum of Hsinchu City

== See also ==
- List of railway stations in Taiwan
