= Fugui railway station =

Railway station in Hengshan, Hsinchu County, Taiwan

Fugui Station 富貴車站
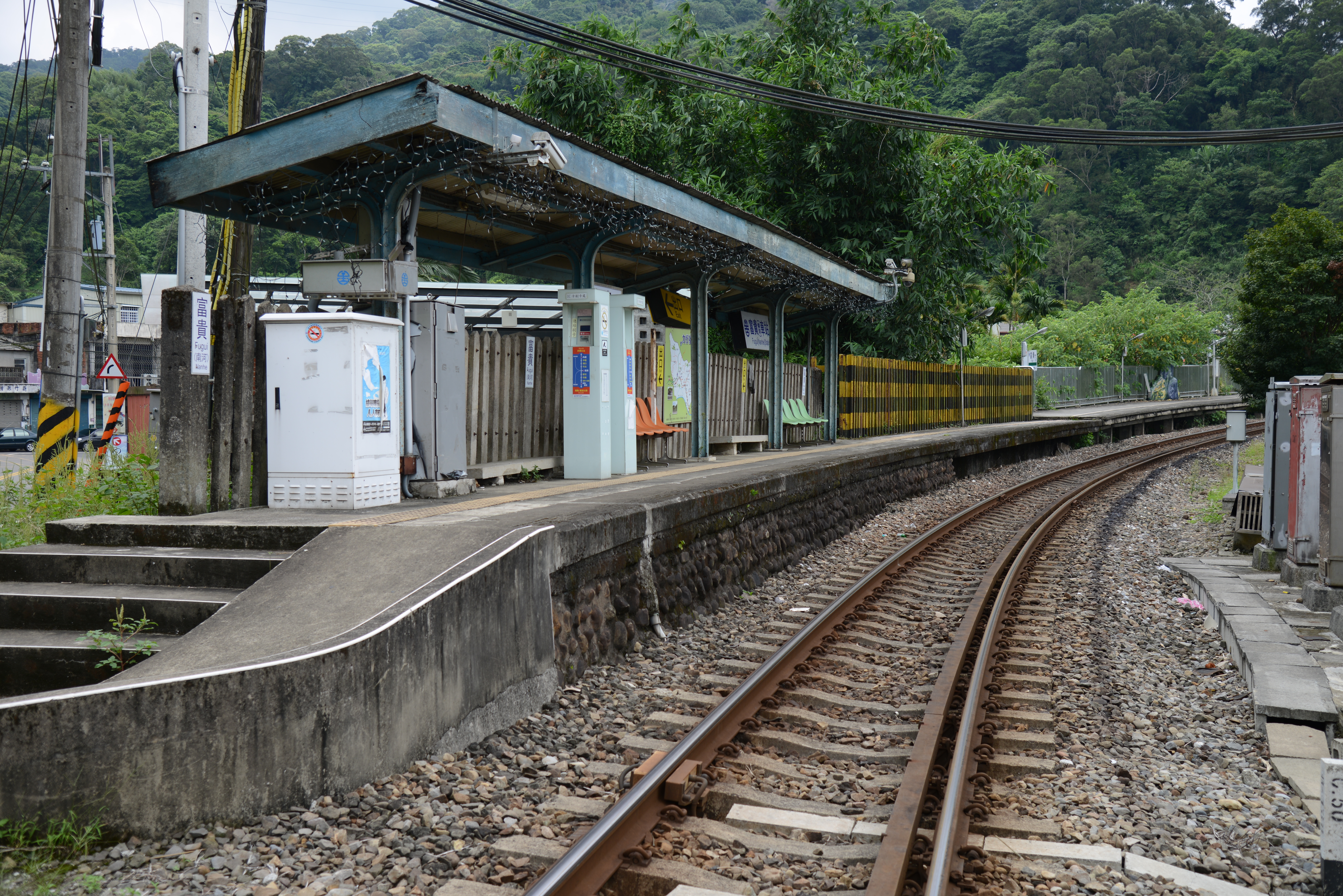

Chinese name
- Traditional Chinese: 富貴車站
Transcriptions
Standard Mandarin
- Hanyu Pinyin: Fùguì Chēzhàn
- Bopomofo: ㄈㄨˋ ㄍㄨㄟˋ ㄔㄜ ㄓㄢˋ

General information
- Location: Hengshan, Hsinchu County; Taiwan
- Coordinates: 24°42′56.0″N 121°10′02.8″E
- System: Taiwan Railway railway station
- Line: Neiwan line
- Distance: 25.7 km to Hsinchu
- Platforms: 1 side platform

Construction
- Structure type: At-grade

Other information
- Station code: 247

History
- Opened: 28 November 1962

Passengers
- 2017: 4,008 per year
- Rank: 218

Services
Preceding station	Taiwan Railway	Following station
Hexing towards Hsinchu	Neiwan line	Neiwan Terminus
Location

Fugui railway station (Chinese: 富貴車站; pinyin: Fùguì Chēzhàn) is a railway station located in Hengshan, Hsinchu County, Taiwan. It is located on the Neiwan line and is operated by the Taiwan Railway.

The station was formerly known as Nanho railway station (Chinese: 南河車站; pinyin: Nánhé Chēzhàn; Wade–Giles: Nan-ho che-chan), but TRA changed its name in 2003 to pair it with Ronghua railway station in order to make the tickets between the two stations auspicious. When put together, the station names spell out the phrase "wealth and honor". The move faced controversy from residents of Nanhe Village.
