= Ronghua railway station =

Railway station located in Hsinchu County, Taiwan

Ronghua Station 榮華車站
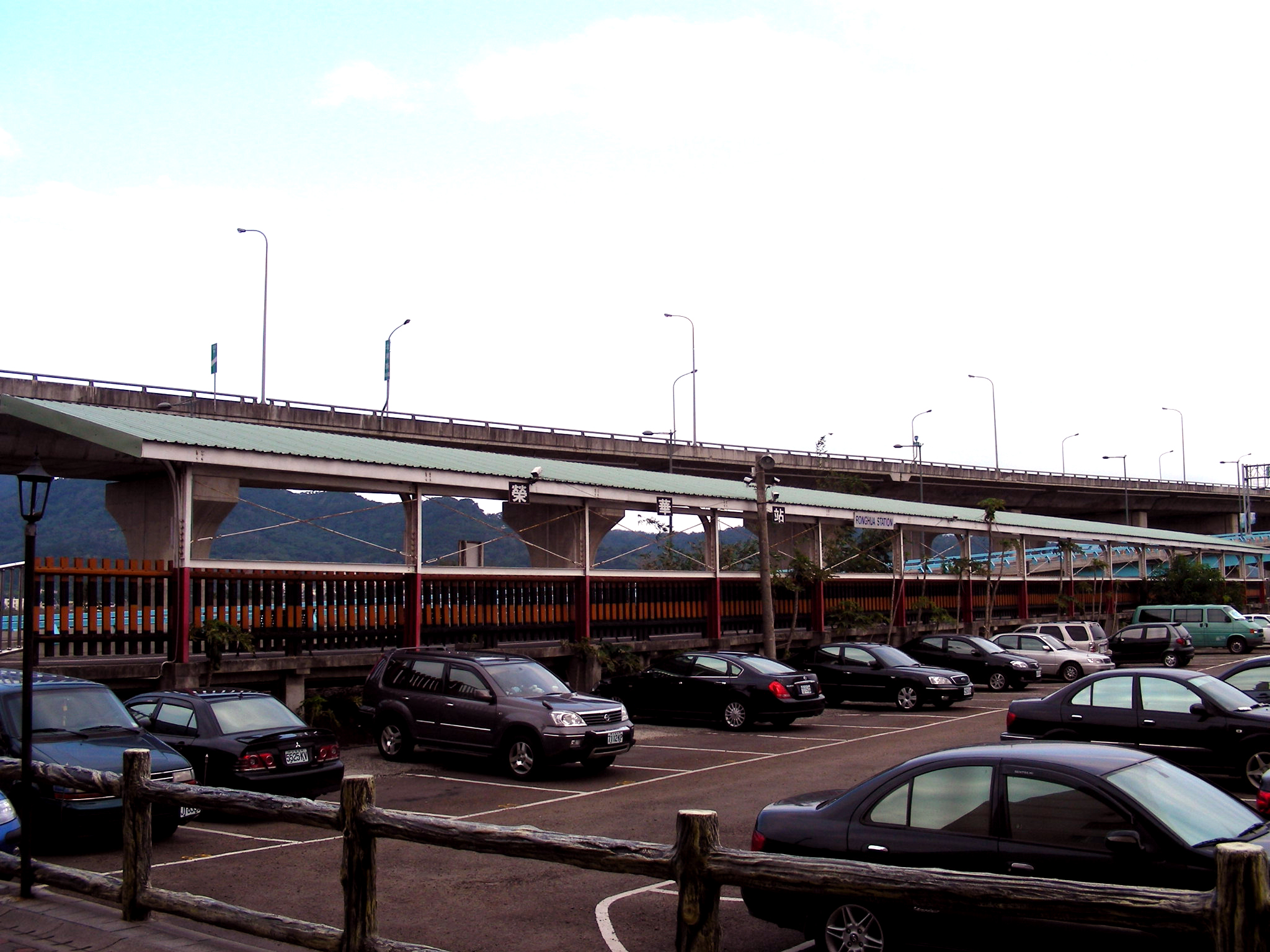

Chinese name
- Traditional Chinese: 榮華車站
Transcriptions
Standard Mandarin
- Hanyu Pinyin: Rónghuá Chēzhàn
- Bopomofo: ㄖㄨㄥˊ ㄏㄨㄚˊ ㄔㄜ ㄓㄢˋ

General information
- Location: Zhudong, Hsinchu County, Taiwan
- Coordinates: 24°44′54.5″N 121°04′58.9″E
- System: Taiwan Railway railway station
- Line: Neiwan line
- Distance: 15.0 km to Hsinchu
- Platforms: 1 side platform

Construction
- Structure type: At-grade

Other information
- Station code: 249

History
- Opened: 24 November 2001

Passengers
- 2017: 54,041 per year
- Rank: 170

Services
Preceding station	Taiwan Railway	Following station
Shangyuan towards Hsinchu	Neiwan line	Zhudong towards Neiwan
Location

Ronghua railway station (Chinese: 榮華車站; pinyin: Rónghuá Chēzhàn) is a railway station located in Zhudong, Hsinchu County, Taiwan. It is located on the Neiwan line and is operated by the Taiwan Railway.

Tickets sold between Ronghua and Fugui railway station are considered auspicious because the stations names form the phrase "wealth and honor".
