= Edmondson railway ticket =

System for recording the payment of railway fares

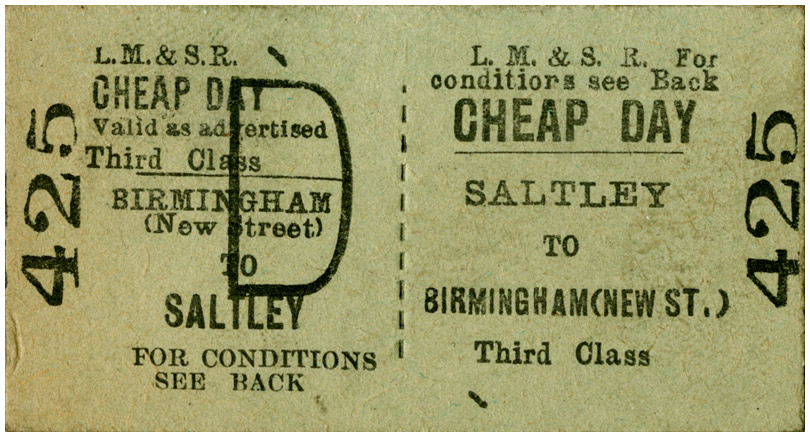
LMS Saltley to Birmingham New Street Third Class Cheap Day Return

Edmondson railway ticket dimensions in millimetres, centimetres and inches.

The Edmondson railway ticket was a system for recording the payment of railway fares and accounting for the revenue raised, introduced in the 1840s. It is named after its inventor, Thomas Edmondson, a trained cabinet maker, who became a station master on the Newcastle and Carlisle Railway in England.

He introduced his system on the Manchester and Leeds Railway. Previously, railway companies had used handwritten tickets, as was the practice for stagecoaches, but it was laborious for a ticket clerk to write out a ticket for each passenger and long queues were common at busy stations.

A faster means of issuing pre-printed tickets was needed. There was also a need to provide accountability by serial-numbering each ticket to prevent unscrupulous clerks from pocketing the fares. After the introduction of Edmonson tickets, they had to reconcile the takings against the serial numbers of the unsold tickets at the end of each day.

The Edmondson system came into general use with the creation of the Railway Clearing House in 1842, becoming "the essential standard feature".

== Edmondson tickets in the United Kingdom ==
The tickets were printed on card cut to 1 7/32 by 2 1/4 inches (31.0 by 57.2 mm), with a nominal thickness of 1/32 inch (0.79 mm). The whole system, from printing to bulk storage to ticket racks, dating and issue, was based on these measurements. Although there is some small variation nowadays (metricated to 30 x 57 x 0.75 mm for example), it is still a vital component of the system.

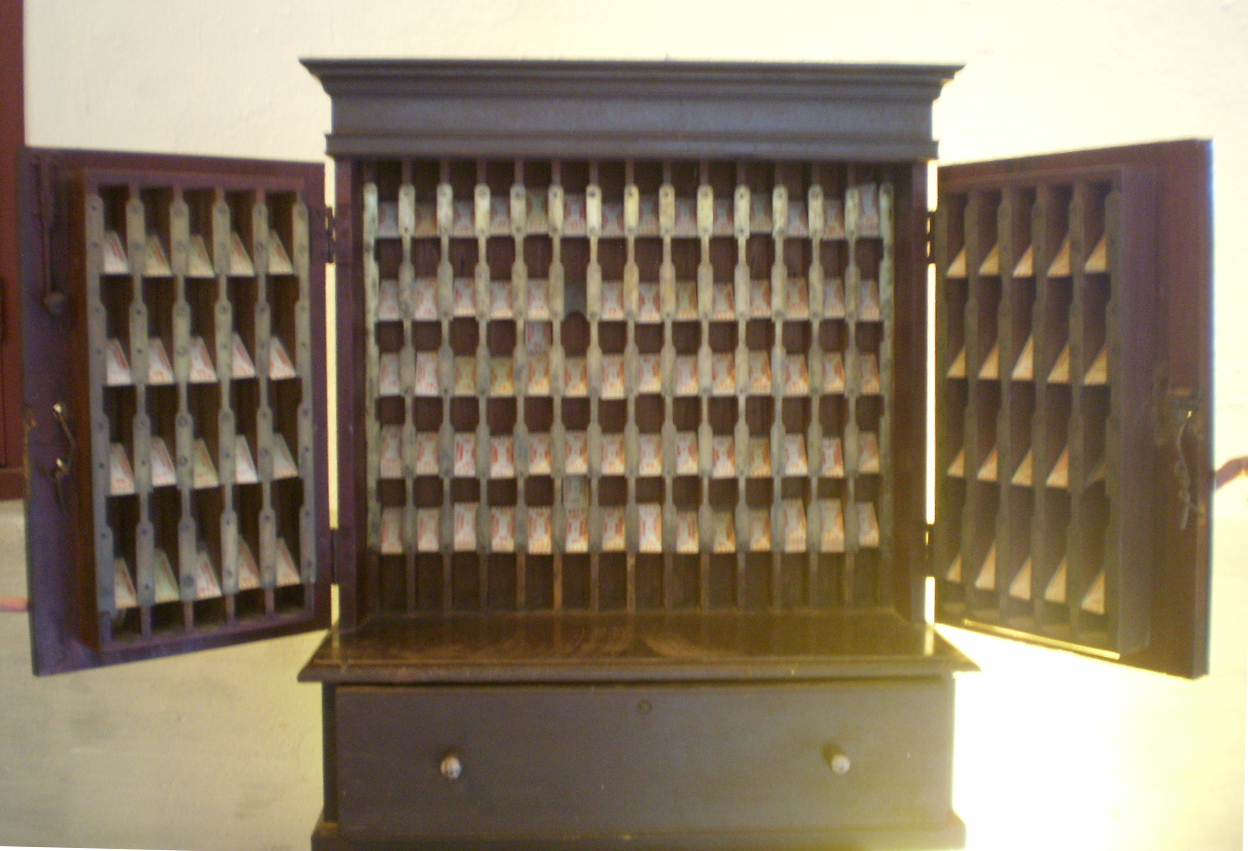
Cabinet for Edmondson tickets, Sapucai station, FCPCAL, Paraguay

The tickets in each series were individually numbered. When a ticket was issued, it was date-stamped by a custom-made machine. The tickets to different destinations and of different types were stored in a lockable cupboard, and the lowest-numbered remaining ticket of each type was visible. Different colours and patterns helped distinguish the different types of tickets.

British Rail's centralised paper and printing centre at Crewe had a number of pre-1900 Waterlow printing presses which met its annual demand for 320 million tickets. The last press was switched off in 1988 and the use of Edmondson tickets by British Rail completely ceased in February 1990 after being replaced by the standard APTIS orange card tickets.

Vertical-format Edmondson card-size tickets were the final manifestation of the Edmondson in the UK. The NCR21 system was used at Southern Region station booking offices from the late 1960s to the mid-1980s, until supplanted by the early generation of computerised systems including INTIS and APTIS. Vertical-format Edmondsons were validated in NCR21 cash registers, which is the machine-printed date/fare/machine number on the ticket front. Some NCR24 machines were later bought from Dutch Railways for use on the Southern and those were distinguishable from NCR21 because the machine data, in a slightly different format, appeared upside down on tickets.

Even smaller stations would carry pre-printed ticket stock for single and return, adult and child journeys to numerous local stations and to London, with "blank" stock also available for use for journeys for which no printed stock was available. On those tickets, the destination of the journey had to be written-in by hand.

The use of Edmondson tickets issued by British Rail declined during the 1980s as they were superseded by computerised systems. After APTIS was launched in 1986, NCR21-equipped stations were converted to the new technology, concluding in June 1989 with the removal of Edmondson tickets from Emerson Park railway station.

A sale of special commemorative "last day of issue" Edmondson tickets was commissioned. The sum of £500 was raised for Great Ormond Street Hospital as the result of the sale of last-day commemorative tickets.

The Edmondson system is still in use on many heritage railways in the UK. For example, the Severn Valley Railway, the West Somerset Railway, the Bluebell Railway, the Isle of Wight Steam Railway and the Swanage Railway print Edmondson tickets for their own use, as well as a number of other heritage lines. In Sussex, the Bluebell Railway has a number of Edmondson printing machines that are to be placed on display in a specially-built museum at the front of Sheffield Park station. There are several small companies that still produce Edmondson tickets on request.

=== Half fares ===
Typically, half-fare single tickets (e.g., for children, dogs, and bicycles) would be created by cutting the ticket in half vertically, and half-fare return tickets had a diagonal cut across the ticket, having the value of half the adult fare. The remaining part was placed in a groove in the lid of the ticket rack above its tube. It could then be used as another child ticket, or counted as a credit.

=== Rear of ticket ===
The reverse side of a ticket might be endorsed, "Subject to rules and regulations of the issuing railway company". In Poland alternative (less popular) destinations were printed there (e.g., "albo [Polish for 'or'] Lucynów, albo Mienia" for a ticket from Warsaw to a then-popular summer vacation village, Urle).

== Use in other countries ==
The Edmondson system was widely used in European countries such as Austria, Belgium, the Netherlands, Czechoslovakia, Romania, France, Germany, Hungary, Italy (until mid 1995), the Soviet Union, Norway, Poland, and Switzerland, as well as outside Europe, for example in Australia and Argentina. The use of Edmondson tickets ceased in most countries in the 1980s or 1990s.

In Switzerland, Edmondson tickets were issued until December 2007 at some stations, especially of the RhB. Edmondson tickets are still printed and distributed (also via internet order) by Druckerei Aeschbacher in Worb (Bern/Switzerland) and Atelier Typo de la Cité in Lausanne. They are still used on the Blonay-Chamby Museum Railway.

While they are no longer used on main-line railways in Australia, Edmondson tickets are still issued by some heritage and tourist railways including Pichi Richi Railway in Quorn, South Australia for their scheduled services and special events.

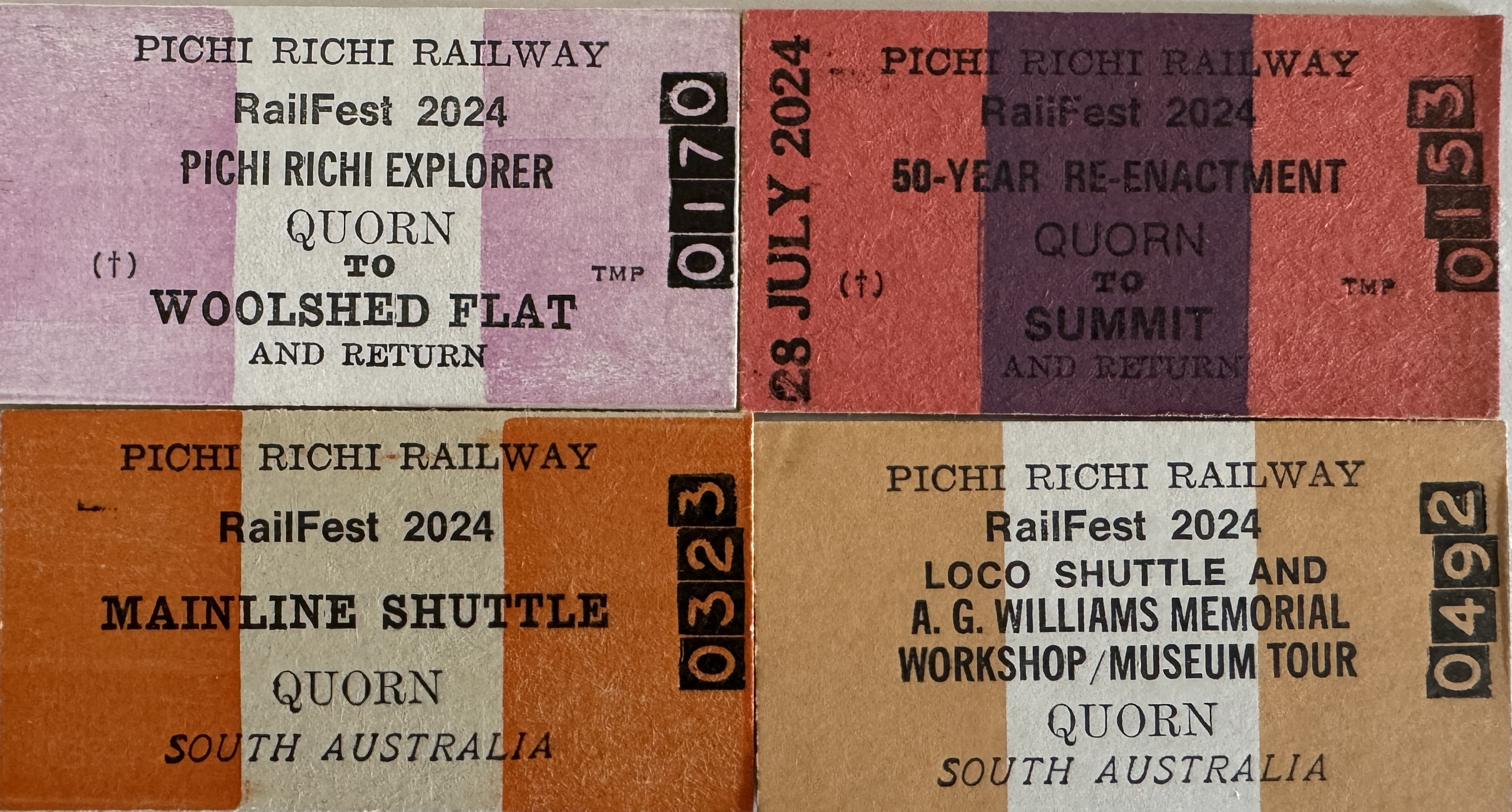
Pichi Richi Railway tickets

In Canada, Edmondson tickets were used on Toronto-area GO Train service from service inception in 1967 until 1989.

In Czechoslovakia there were two printing houses that produced Edmondson tickets, the first in Prague from 1898 until 1999, the second in Vrútky, both part of the state transportation publishing house NADAS, since privatized as NADAS AFGH s. r. o. (Ltd.). In 1993 Czechoslovakia split into the Czech Republic and Slovakia and the state railway company ČSD was divided into České dráhy (ČD) and Železnice Slovenskej republiky (ŽSR). The Prague printing house produced 50,000 tickets per day until start of decrement. Since 1999 ČD stopped ordering these tickets and production stopped. In 1999, the new private narrow-gauge railway company Jindřichohradecké místní dráhy (JHMD, Local Railways of Jindřichův Hradec surroundings) bought the machine accessories from Prague and since 2000 it has run its own printing house at Kamenice nad Lipou, for its own use and for nostalgic trips on ČD and a number of museum railways. JHMD has one of two extant Goebl printing machines from 1895 in the world, together with four newer machines. In the eighties, at ten of the biggest railway stations in Czechoslovakia special mechanical printing machines were used, which printed tickets in Edmondson's format.

They are still used in Paraguay by the Ferrocarril Presidente Don Carlos Antonio Lopez, now Ferrocarriles del Paraguay SA (2011).

The government-owned Sri Lanka Railways uses second-hand machines purchased from the Netherlands to print their tickets.

In Japan, most local railway tickets keep the Edmondson format. These are modern magnetic back tickets issued by vending machines, punched by automatic station entry gates and collected at the exit gates. In some rural stations hand-punching by railway employees is still done.

Due to the Japanese occupation of Korea, South Korea used to use Edmondson tickets for certain types of trains until the introduction of computerized tickets. In some local lines and lower-grade trains, Edmondson format was used after the computerization for a while before magnetic striped card-shape tickets came into use. The ticket was usually hand-punched by employees at the boarding gate, which is now replaced by a proof-of-payment process.

On the Taiwan Railway Administration lines, tickets for local trains also keep the Edmondson format as in Japan. Reserved tickets on the Tzu-Chiang express and high speed rail tickets have a larger format. Some tourist lines (e.g., the Pingxi Line) still use Edmondson tickets. In some cases, the combination of station names on the ticket are interpreted as auspicious, making them a collectable.

The Edmondson tickets have been discontinued on Indian Railways but are still used sparingly and continue on heritage railways in India, such as the Nilgiri Mountain Railway.

In Brazil, the São Paulo Metro used Edmondson tickets from its inception in 1974 until 2026, where they were phased out in favor of QR Code tickets.

Edmondson railway tickets from around the world

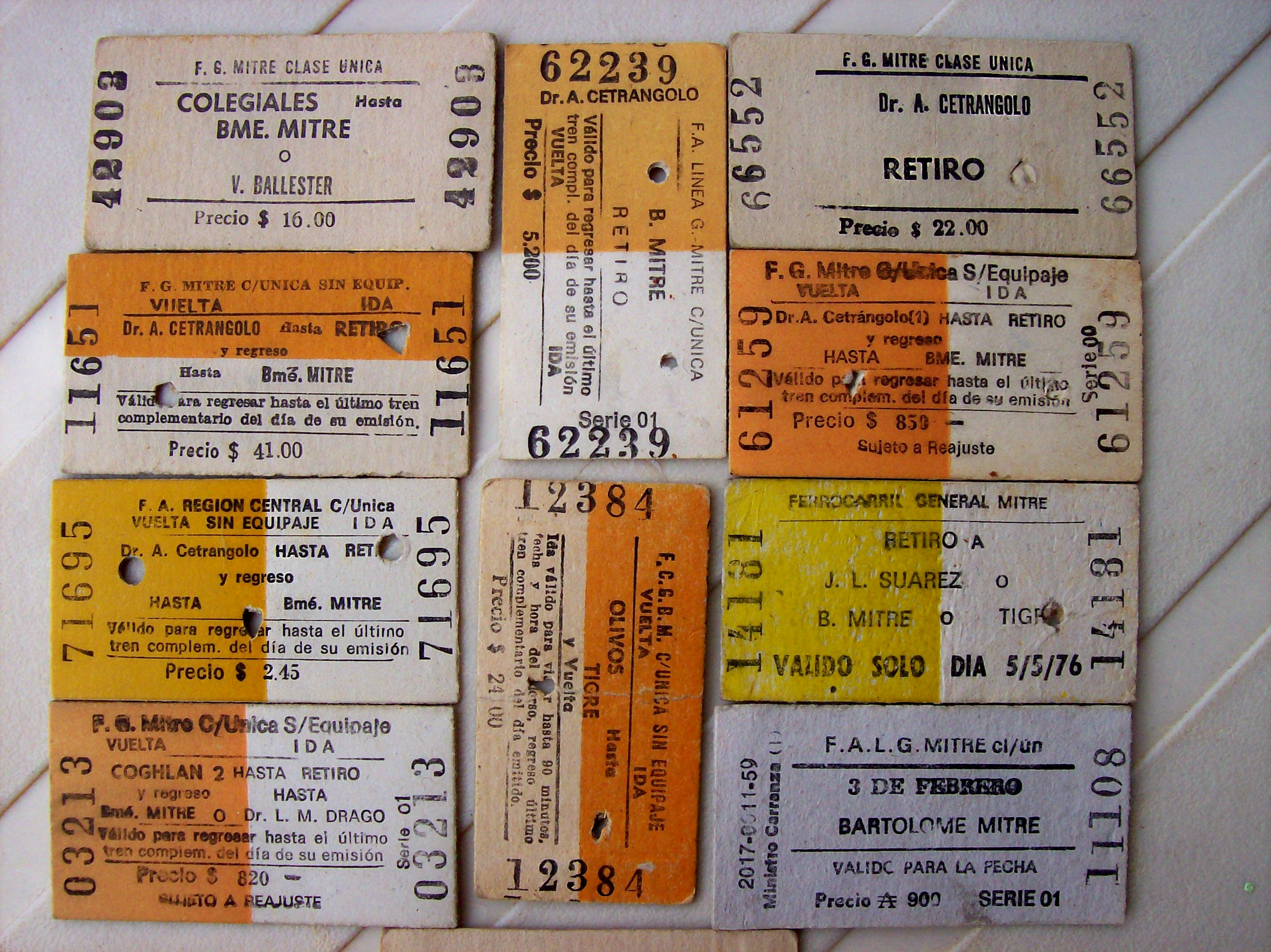
Argentina - Ferrocarriles Argentinos

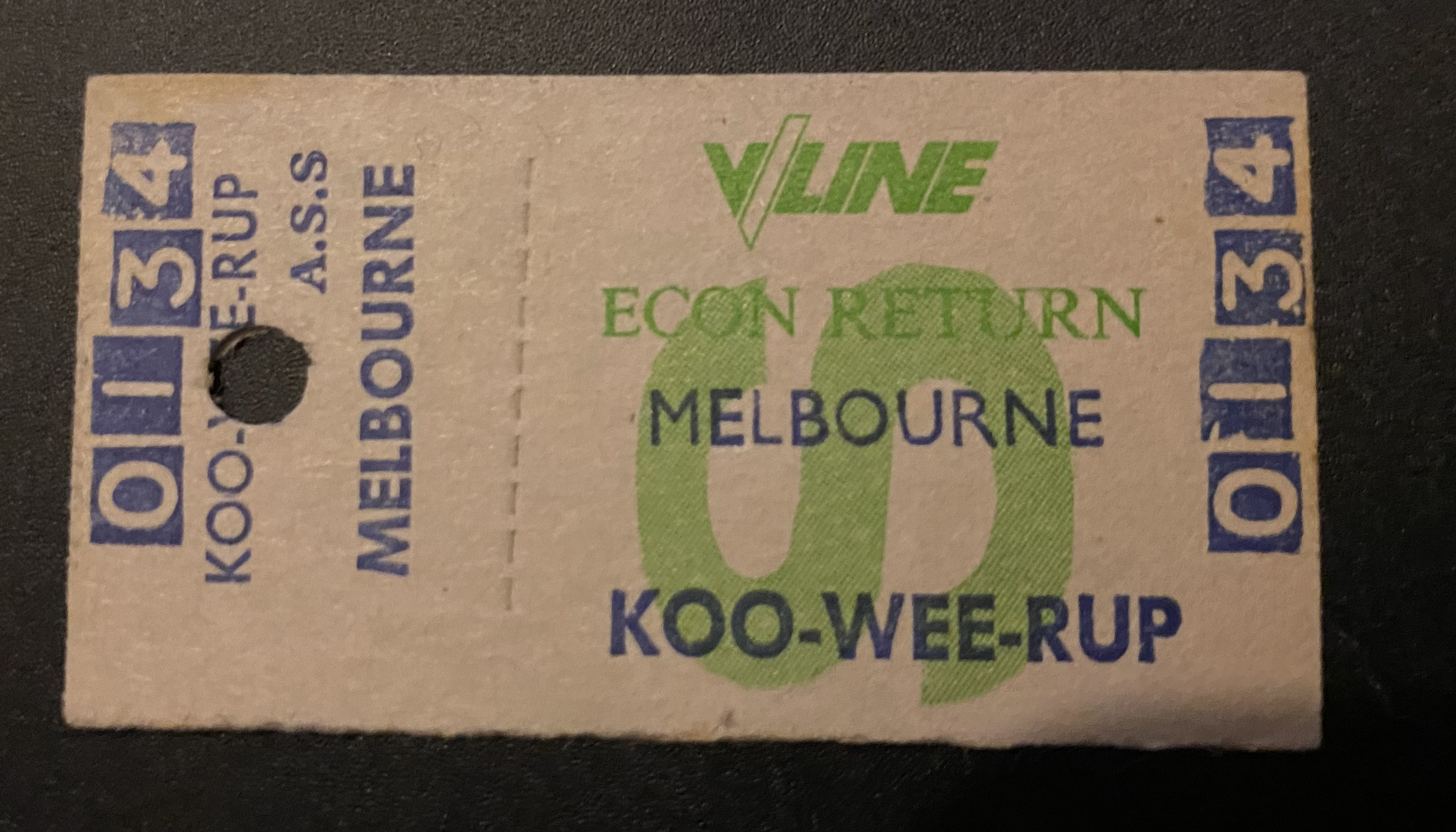
Australia - V/Line, 1987

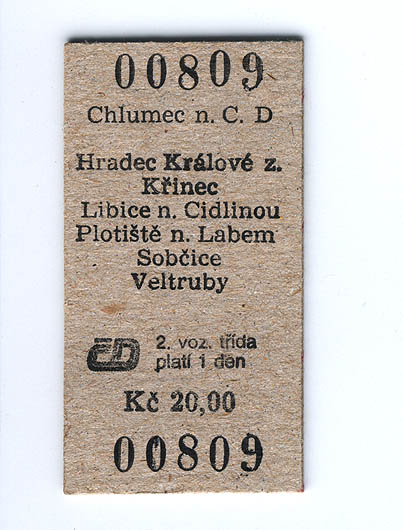
Czech Republic - Czech Railways

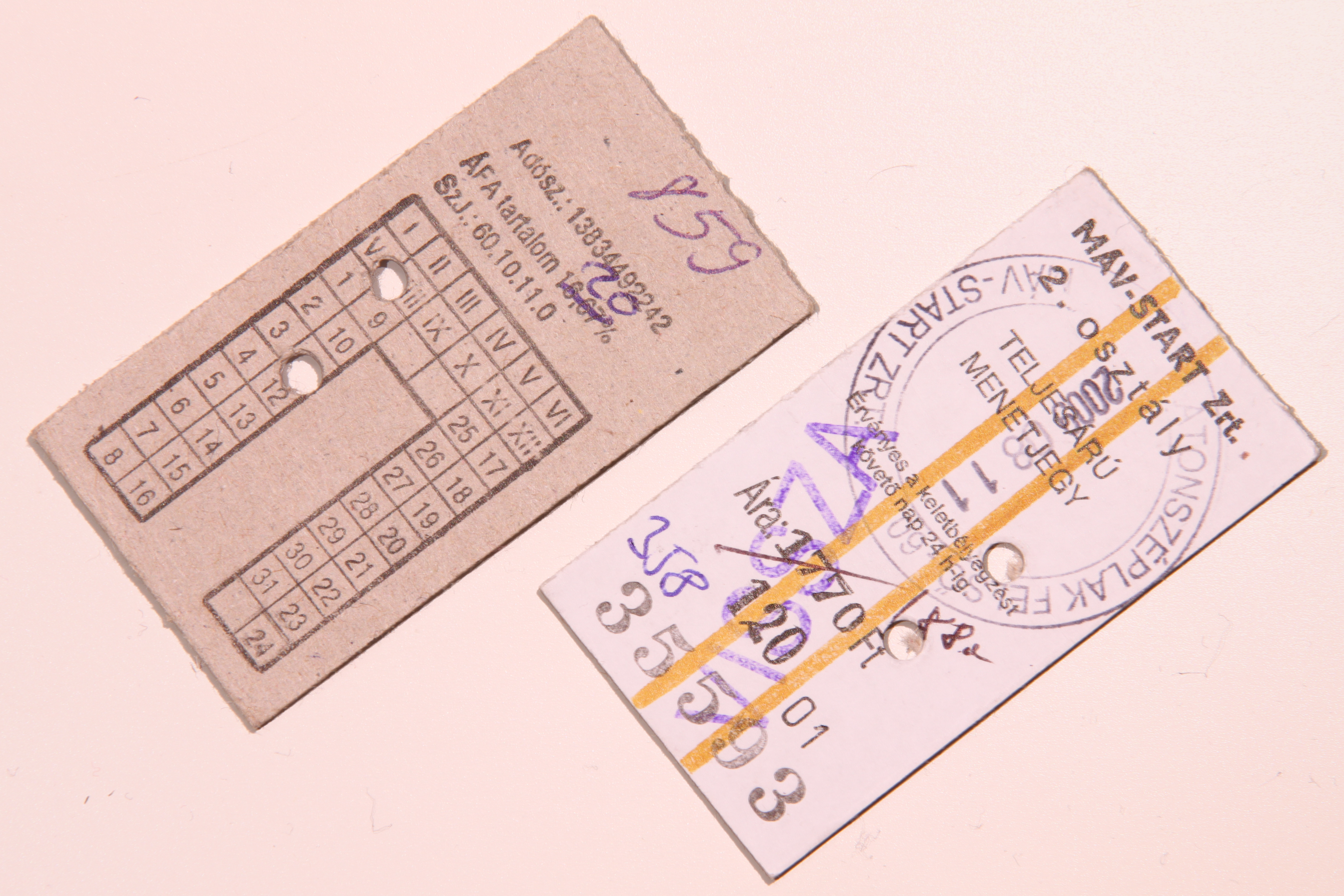
Hungary - Hungarian State Railways, 2009

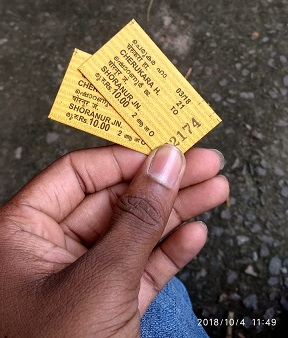
India - Indian Railways, 2018

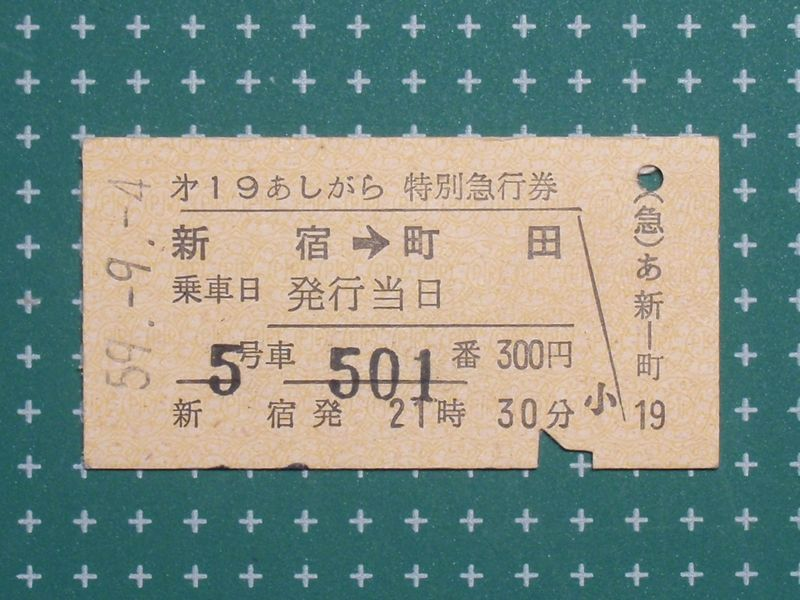
Japan - Odakyu Electric Railway

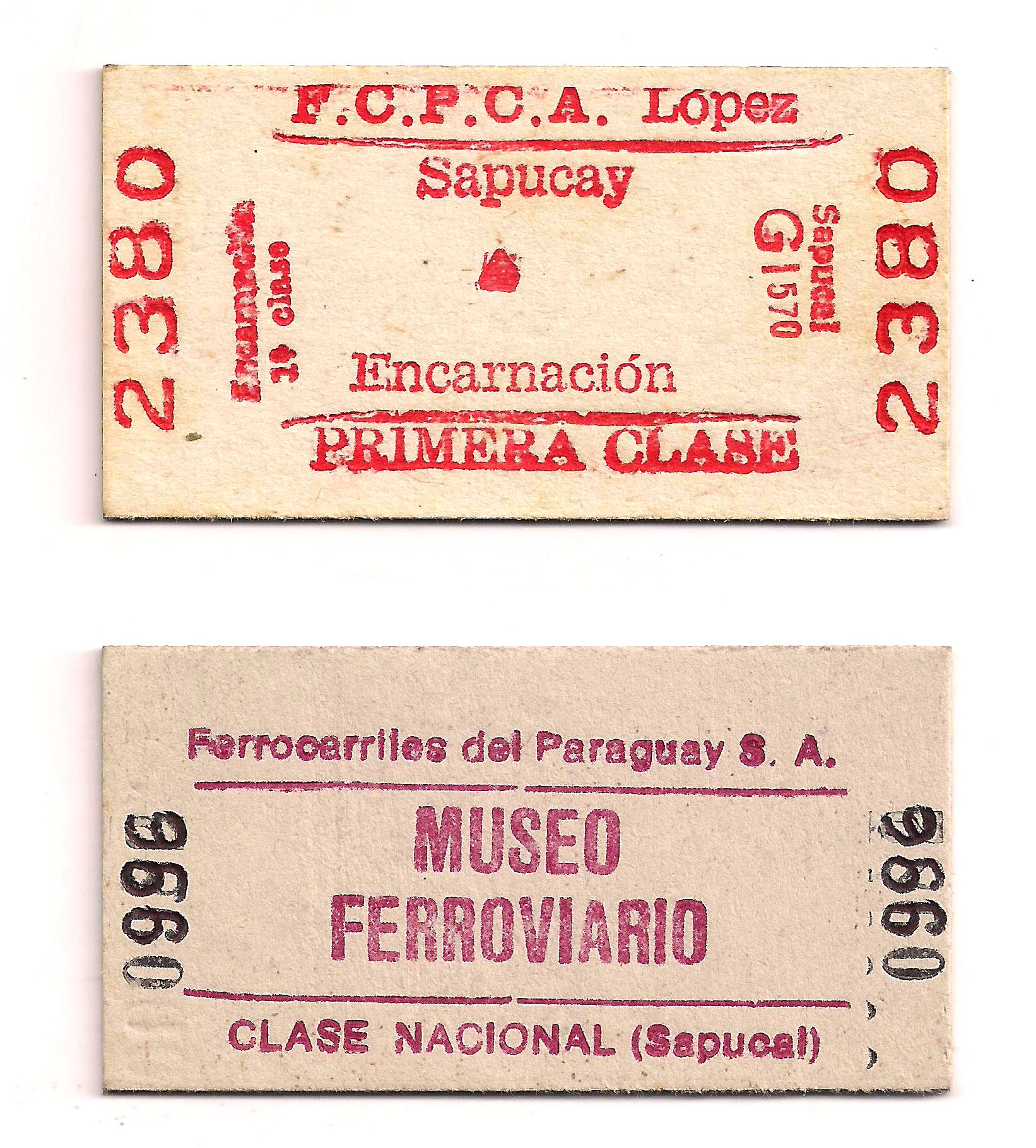
Paraguay

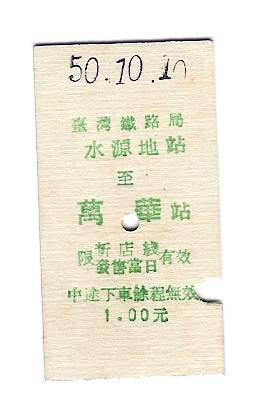
Taiwan - Hsindian Line, 1960s

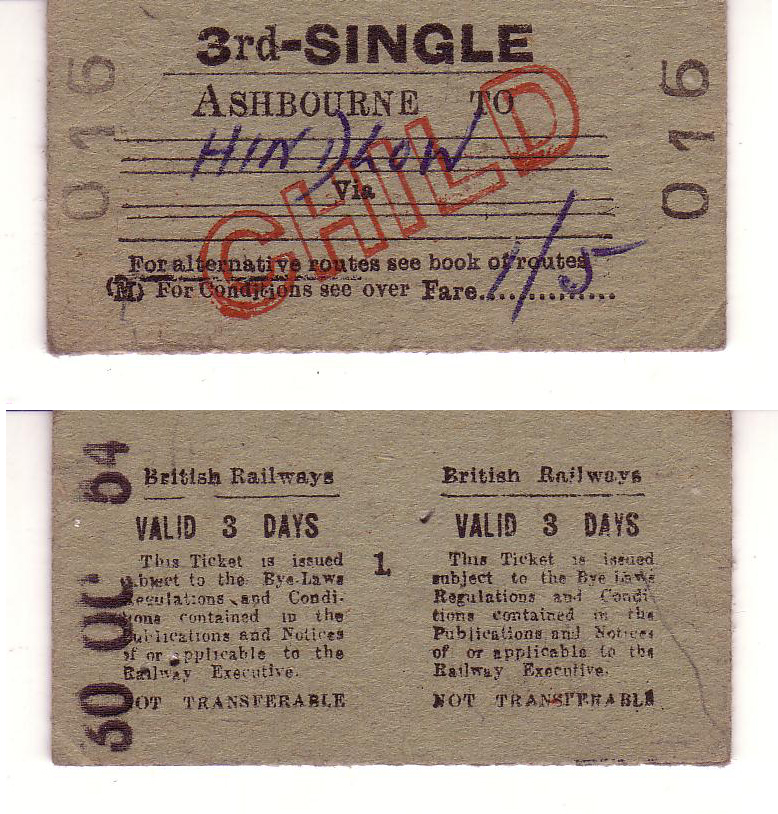
United Kingdom - British Railways, 1954

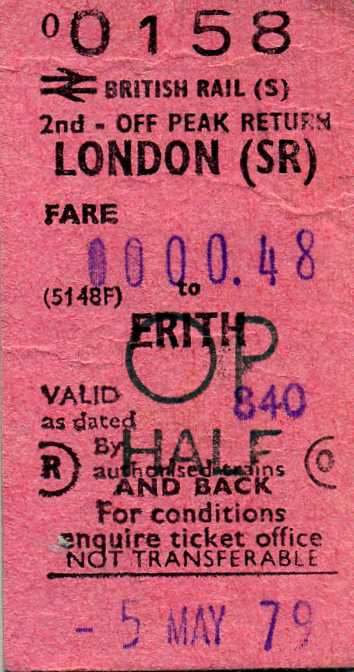
United Kingdom - British Railways, 1979

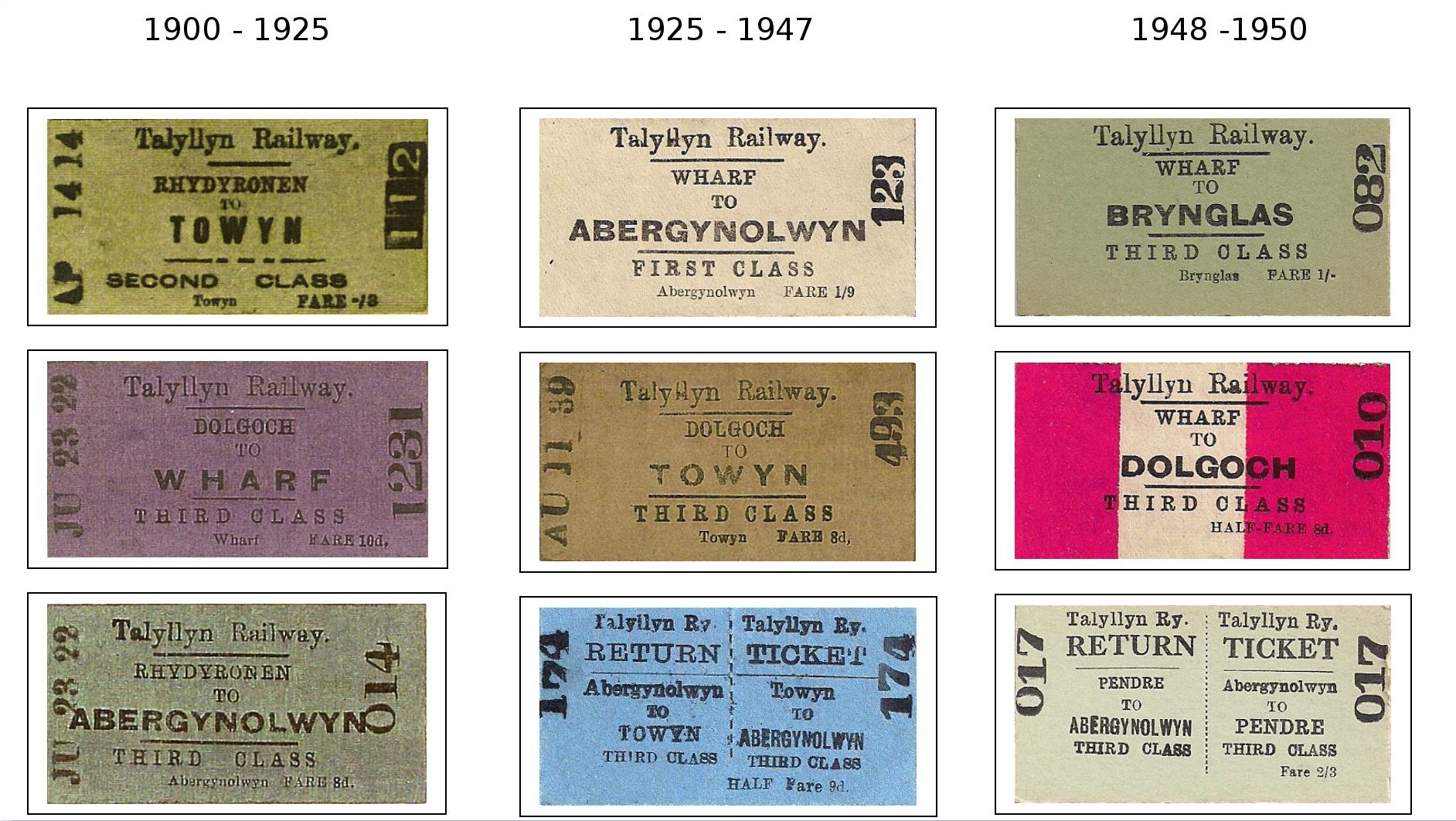
Wales (United Kingdom) - Talyllyn Railway, 1900 - 1950s

== Sources ==
- Davis, Matthew (2013). The Future's Green and Orange: Exploring and Explaining Ticketing in the Privatised Rail Industry. Bishops Stortford: The Transport Ticket Society. ISBN 978-0-903209-75-5.
- Farr, Michael (1991). Thomas Edmondson and his Tickets. Andover: self published. ISBN 978-0-905033-13-6.
- Simmonds, Jack; Biddle, Gordon, eds. (1997). The Oxford Companion to British Railway History: From 1603 to the 1990s. Oxford: Oxford University Press. ISBN 0-19-211697-5.
- Vaughan, Adrian (1997). Railwaymen, Politics and Money: The Great Age of Railways in Britain. London: John Murray. ISBN 0-719-55150-1.
