= Thomas Edmondson =

English inventor

- Born: 30 June 1792; Lancaster
- Died: 22 June 1851 (aged 58); Manchester
- Known for: Edmondson railway ticket

Thomas Edmondson (30 June 1792 in Lancaster, England – 22 June 1851 in Manchester, England) was the inventor of the Edmondson railway ticket.

He was a Quaker and originally worked at the Gillow cabinet making business in Lancaster.

While working as a station master at Milton (later Brampton) on the Newcastle and Carlisle Railway, he devised the idea of a new type of railway ticket: a small piece of cardboard, pre-printed with journey details (as opposed to the then current hand-written paper bill). The tickets would be numbered by hand, and validated by a separate date-stamping press when purchased. He also invented and built a foot-operated version of the latter device.

When the Manchester and Leeds Railway opened in 1839, Edmondson became the company's chief booking clerk at Manchester.

The invention which made Edmondson's fortune was his final development: a machine which would print tickets in batches complete with the serial numbers. He patented the machine and was able to charge a royalty to railway companies amounting to ten shillings per annum per mile of a company's routes.

His machines and their improved successors quickly became the standard for British and other railways. He died a wealthy man, and members of his family carried on the business for many years afterwards.

The South Tynedale Railway, based at Alston, Cumbria, operates an 0-4-0 Henschel-designed steam locomotive, which was named after Thomas Edmondson on the 125th anniversary of his card ticket invention. The STR also uses Edmondson tickets for travel.

The Norwegian State Railways (Norges Statsbaner - NSB) used Edmondson Card Ticket until the late 1990s, some small stations in the Oslo local traffic area being the last to sell them. The Norwegian Railway Club «inherited» the NSB's last two ticket printing presses. As of 2022, one of them was still in working order, being used to print tickets for Norwegian heritage railway lines.

== Bibliography ==
- Farr, Michael (1991). Thomas Edmondson and his tickets. Andover: M. Farr. ISBN 0-905033-13-2.
