= Hsinchu HSR station =

Railway station in Hsinchu, Taiwan

Hsinchu 新竹
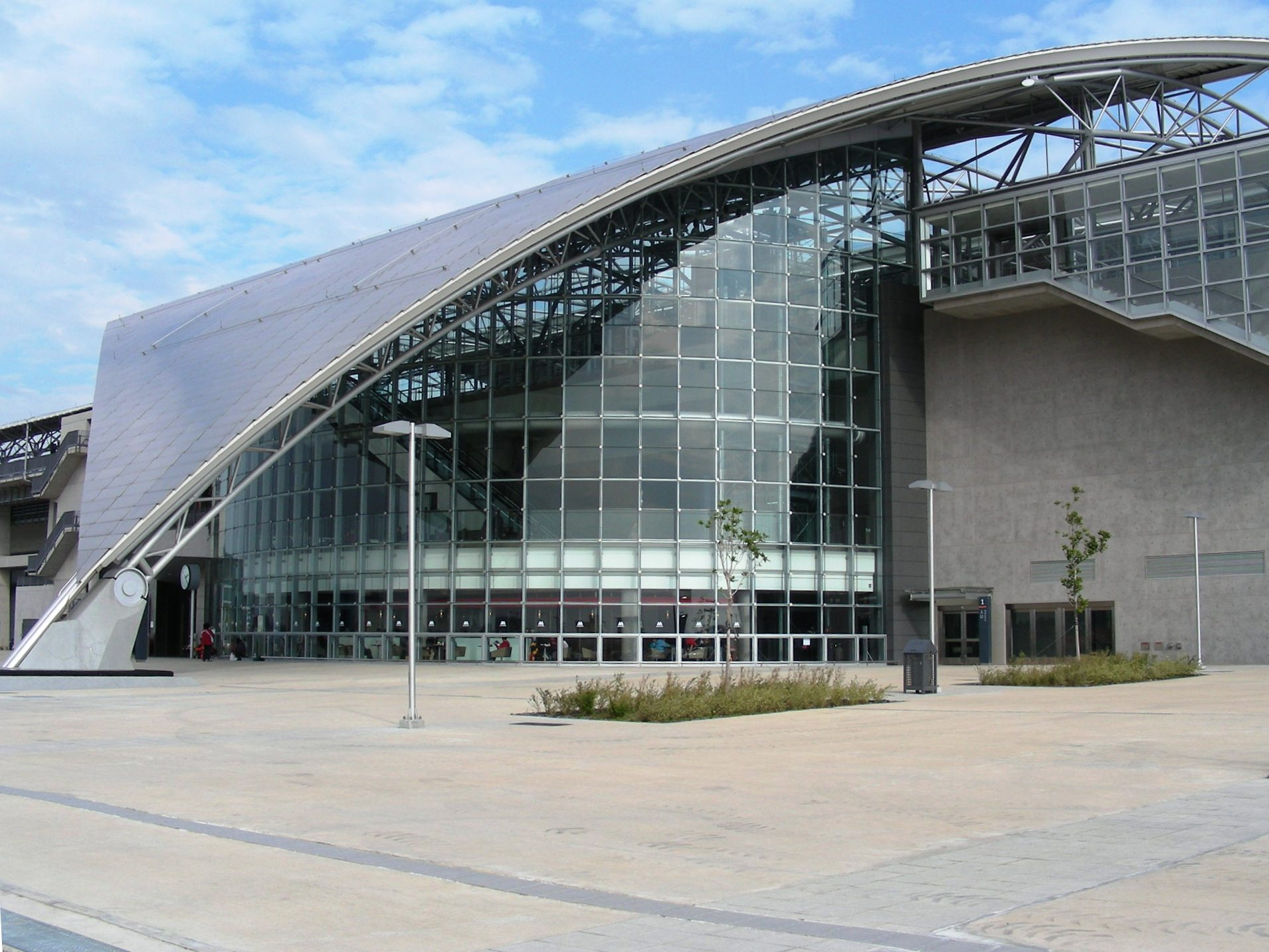
- Station exterior

Chinese name
- Traditional Chinese: 新竹
Transcriptions
Standard Mandarin
- Hanyu Pinyin: Xīnzhú
- Bopomofo: ㄒㄧㄣ ㄓㄨˊ
- Wade–Giles: Hsin¹-chu²
Hakka
- Romanization: Xín-zùg (Sixian dialect); Sìn-zhug (Hailu dialect)
Southern Min
- Tâi-lô: Sin-tik

General information
- Location: 6 Gaotie 7th Rd; Zhubei, Hsinchu County; Taiwan
- Coordinates: 24.8082°N 121.0403°E
- System: THSR railway station
- Line: THSR
- Distance: 72.1 km
- Connections: Conventional rail; Coach

Construction
- Structure type: Elevated
- Architect: Kris Yao

Other information
- Station code: HSC／05
- Website: www.thsrc.com.tw/en/StationInfo/Prospect/c27e555b-b8aa-45f2-b034-14241a041503

History
- Opened: 2007-01-05

Passengers
- 2018: 11.679 million per year ▲8.51%
- Rank: 5 out of 12

Services
Preceding station	Taiwan High Speed Rail	Following station
Taoyuan towards Nangang	THSR	Miaoli towards Zuoying
Location
- Location within Taiwan

Hsinchu (Chinese: 新竹; pinyin: Xīnzhú; Wade–Giles: Hsin¹-chu²) is a railway station in Hsinchu County, Taiwan served by Taiwan High Speed Rail. It opened for service in 2006. The station was designed by Taiwanese architect Kris Yao. Transfers to Taiwan Railway Liujia station can be made at this station, which links to the Hsinchu TRA station located In Hsinchu City. Hsinchu HSR station is 11 km away from Hsinchu TRA station.

== Overview ==
The station has two side platforms and is the smallest station in the system. The newly opened Taiwan Railway Administration Liujia Line (a spur of the 12 km (7.5 mi) Neiwan Line) links the high-speed rail station from Liujia station with the TRA Hsinchu Station. Liujia line opened for service on 11 November 2011.

The station was designed by Kris Yao and constructed by Daiho Corporation. Construction began in July 2002 and was completed in October 2006. The station covers a building site area of 10,451 m^{2} (112,490 ft^{2}) and a total floor area of 20,360 m^{2} (219,200 ft^{2}).

== Station layout ==
3F
3F	Side platform
3F	Platform 1	THSR toward Nangang (Taoyuan)
3F	Platform 2	THSR toward Zuoying (Miaoli)
3F	Side platform

2F	Connecting level	Faregates, waiting area, nursery

Street level	Concourse	Entrance/exit, ticketing, automatic ticket machines, restrooms, information desk Tourism counter, stores Parking lot, transfer station, taxi stand, drop-off area

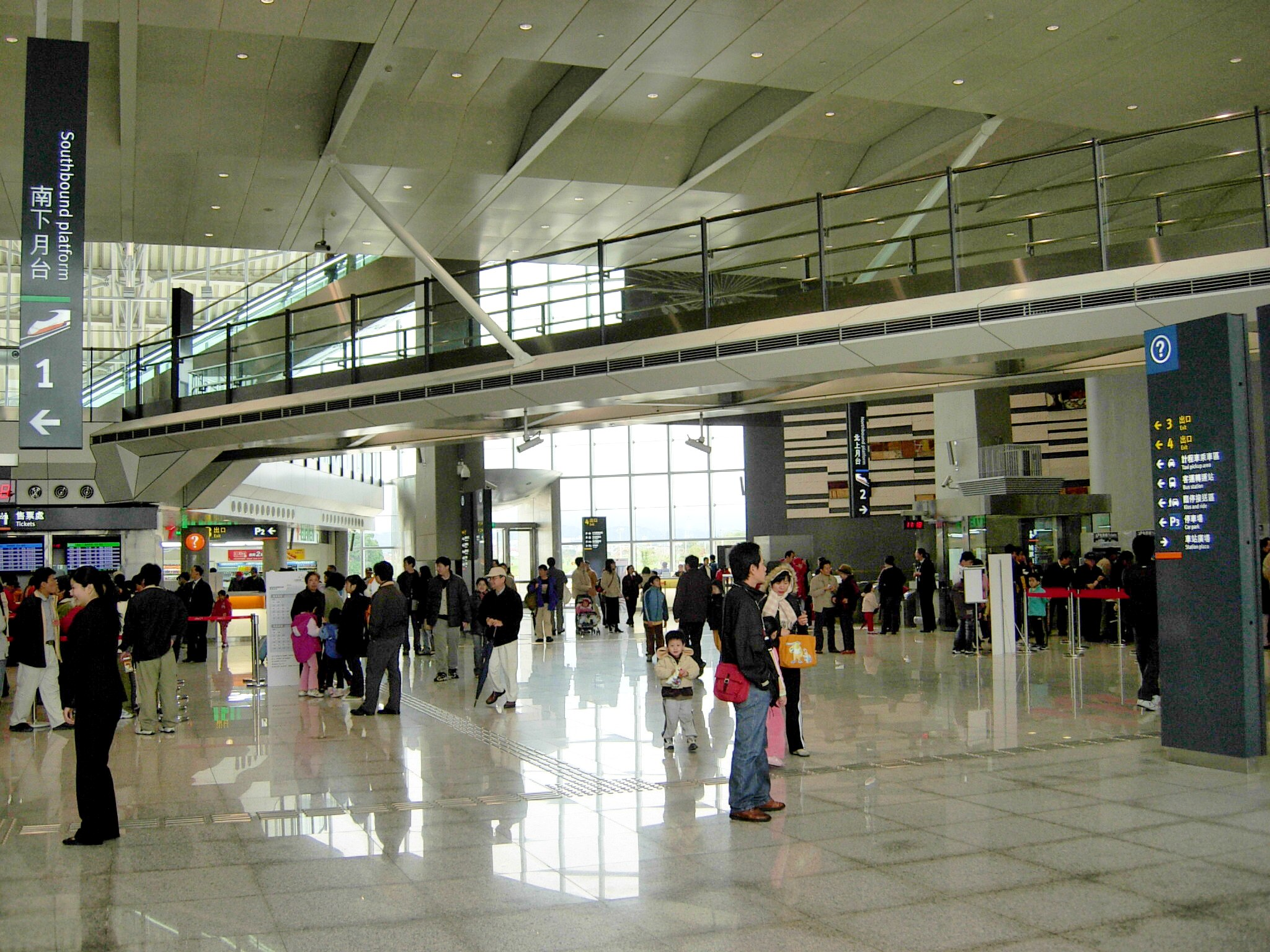
THSR Hsinchu station concourse

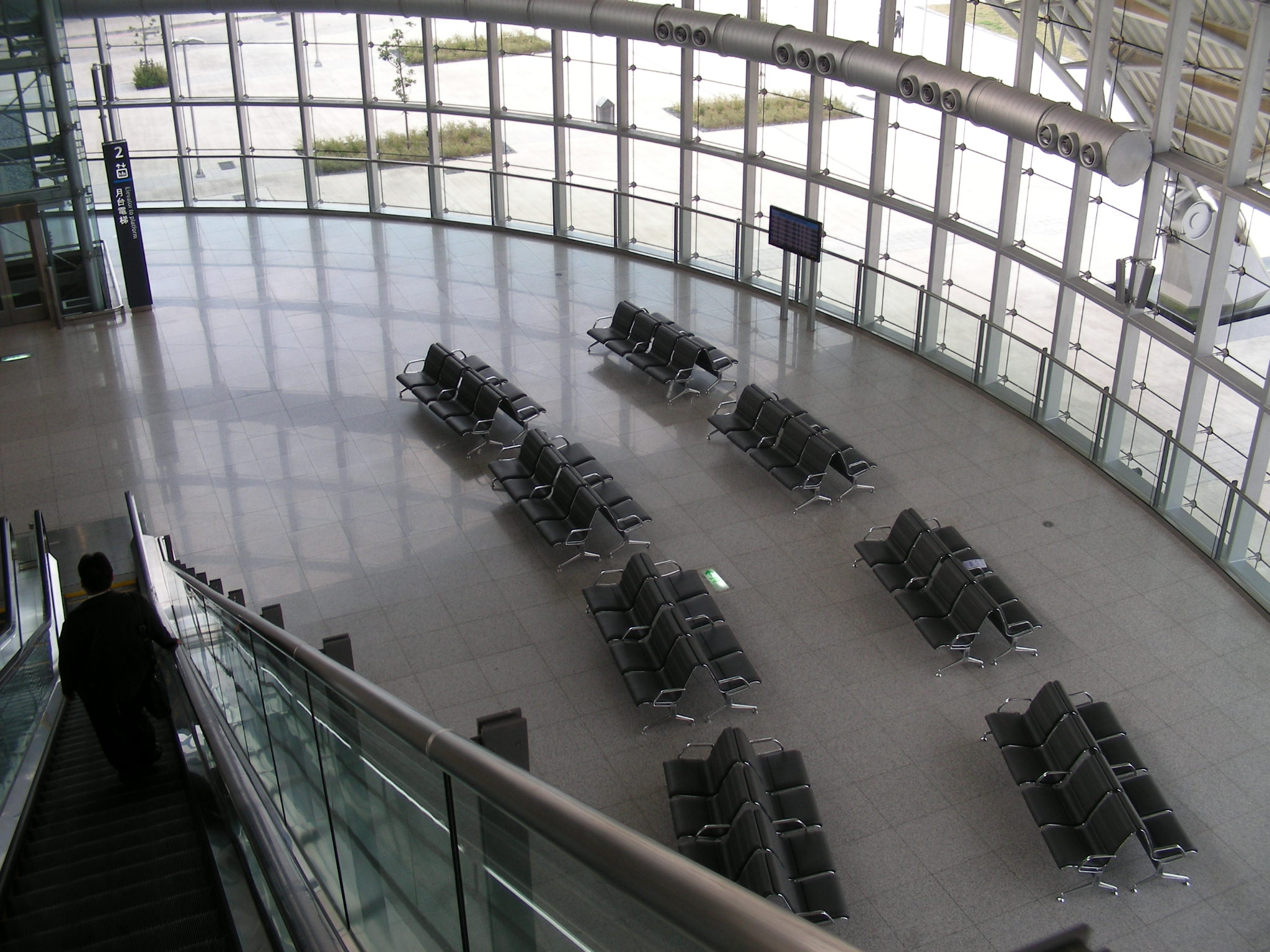
THSR Hsinchu station waiting area

== HSR services ==
HSR services (1)5xx, (Note: Except 583 and 598) (1)6xx, and 8xx call at this station.

== Around the station ==
Highways and train stations

- National Highway No. 1
- Provincial Highway No. 68
- Liujia station

Parks

- Biomedical Research Park
- Knowledge-based Economy Industrial Park
- Central Park
- Zhubei Activity Park
- Ecological Park
- Fruit Park

Universities and schools

- National Yang Ming Chiao Tung University
- National Taiwan University, Zhubei Campus
- National Taiwan University of Science and Technology, Zhubei Campus
- Liujia Junior High School
- Liujia Elementary School

Science parks

- Hsinchu Science and Industrial Park

Stadiums

- Hsinchu County Stadium
- Zhubei Arena

Hotels

- Sheraton Hsinchu Hotel

Museums

- Taiwan Hakka Cultural Center

Shopping malls

- 6+Plaza
- Sky City
- Guangming Shopping Circle

Government offices

- Hsinchu County Government (Hsinchu County Administrative Area)
