= Neiwan line =

Railway line in Taiwan

Neiwan Line
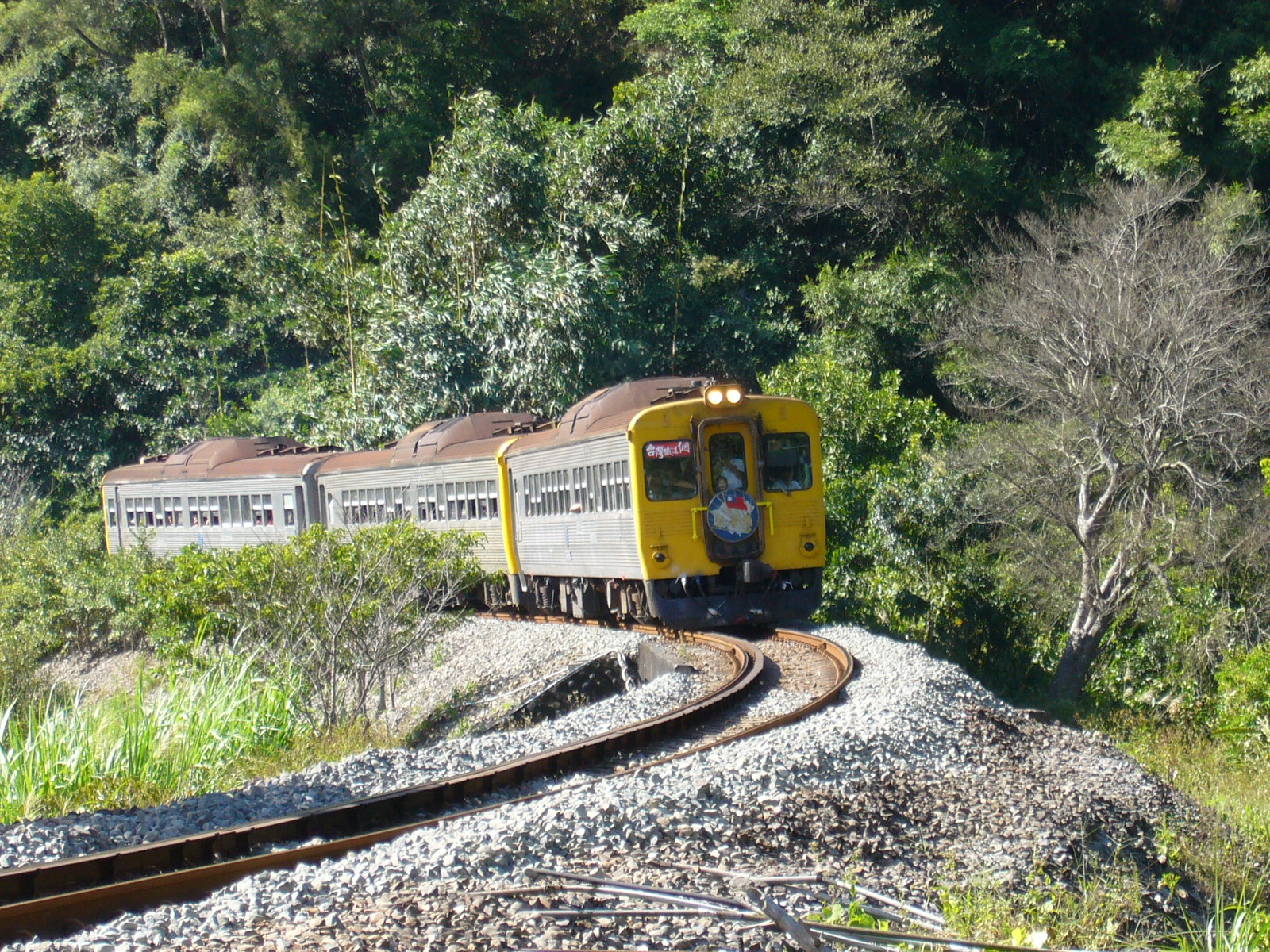

Overview
- Native name: 內灣線
- Owner: Taiwan Railway Corporation
- Termini: Hsinchu; Neiwan
- Stations: 13

Service
- Operator(s): Taiwan Railway Corporation

History
- Opened: 11 September 1951

Technical
- Line length: 27.9 km (17.3 mi)
- Number of tracks: 2 (Hsinchu - Zhuzhong); 1 (Zhuzhong - Neiwan)
- Track gauge: 1,067 mm (3 ft 6 in)
- Electrification: 25 kV AC 60 Hz overhead catenary (Hsinchu - Zhuzhong)

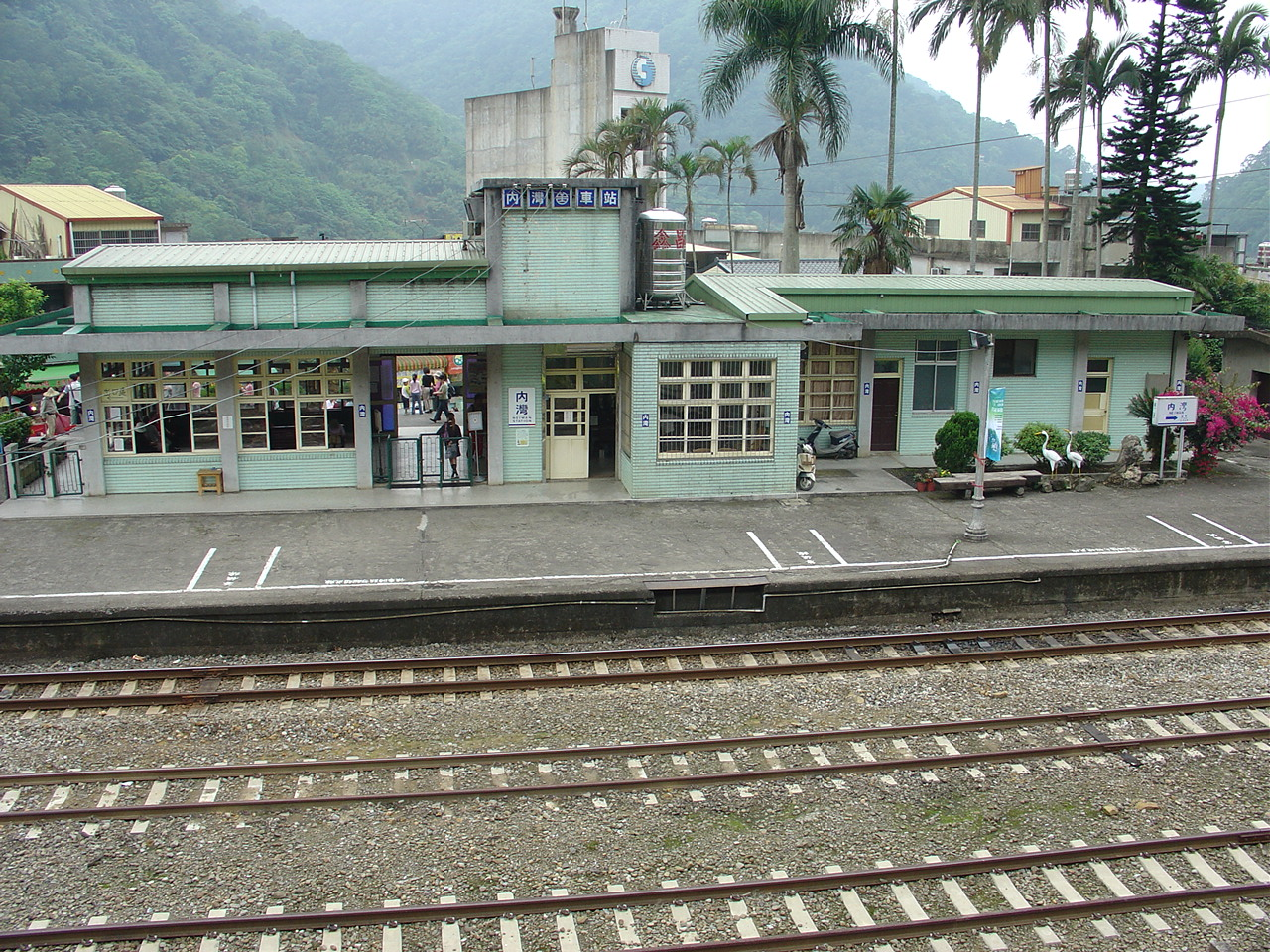
Neiwan station, Hsinchu County

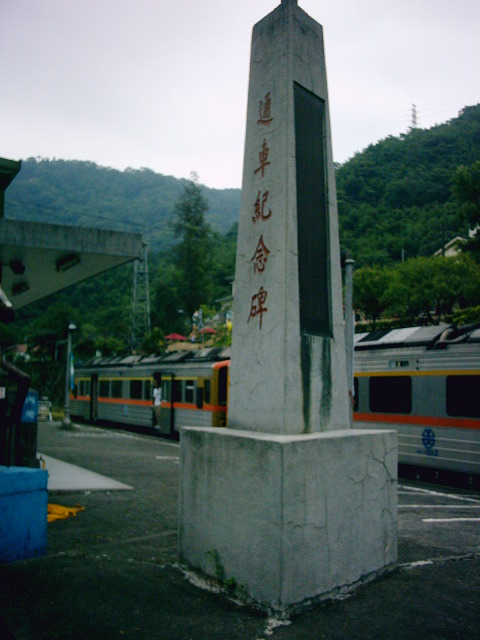
Neiwan Line monument

The Neiwan line (Chinese: 內灣線; pinyin: Nèiwān Xiàn; Pe̍h-ōe-jī: Lāi-oan Soàⁿ) is a railway branch line in Taiwan operated by Taiwan Railway. It is located in Hsinchu County.

== History ==
The Neiwan line was completed on 11 September 1951. It became a popular tourist site in the early 2000s. A through-service between Neiwan and Taipei on Saturdays and Sundays started in 2004.

The section between Hsinchu and Zhudong was temporarily closed from 28 February 2007 in order to facilitate the construction of an electrified, dual-track, grade-separated route from Hsinchu through Zhuzhong and, via a new sub-branch line (the Liujia Line), to the newly opened Hsinchu HSR station. Concurrently, three infill stations were added between Hsinchu and Zhuzhong. The upgraded section was reopened on 11 November 2011.

The section past Zhuzhong remains single-track and unelectrified.

== Liujia branch ==
The Liujia line, which connects TR Hsinchu station and THSR Hsinchu station, branches off from the Neiwan line at Zhuzhong station.

== Operations ==
The Neiwan line is principally serviced by local trains (區間車).

On some special occasions, diesel-powered versions of the Tzu-Chiang Limited Express (自強號) have been used on the route.

== Stations ==
Name	Chinese	Taiwanese	Hakka	Transfers and notes	Location	
Hsinchu	新竹	Sin-tek	Sîn-chuk	→ West Coast line	East	Hsinchu
North Hsinchu	北新竹	Pak Sin-tek	Pet Sîn-chuk	→ West Coast line	East	Hsinchu
Qianjia	千甲	Chhian-kah	Chhiên-kap		East	Hsinchu
Xinzhuang	新莊	Sin-chng	Sîn-chông		East	Hsinchu
Zhuzhong	竹中	Tek-tiong	Chuk-chûng	→ Liujia line to Hsinchu HSR station	Zhudong	Hsinchu; County
Shangyuan	上員	Siōng-goân	Sông-yèn		Zhudong	Hsinchu; County
Ronghua	榮華	Êng-hôa	Yùng-fà		Zhudong	Hsinchu; County
Zhudong	竹東	Tek-tang	Chuk-tûng		Zhudong	Hsinchu; County
Hengshan	橫山	Hoâiⁿ-soaⁿ	Vàng-sân		Hengshan	Hsinchu; County
Jiuzantou	九讚頭	Káu-chàn-thâu	Kiú-chan-theù		Hengshan	Hsinchu; County
Hexing	合興	Ha̍p-heng	Ha̍p-hîn		Hengshan	Hsinchu; County
Fugui	富貴	Hù-kuì	Fu-kui		Hengshan	Hsinchu; County
Neiwan	內灣	Lāi-oan	Nui-vân		Hengshan	Hsinchu; County
