= 6+Plaza =

Shopping mall in Zhubei, Hsinchu County, Taiwan

- 6+Plaza購物廣場
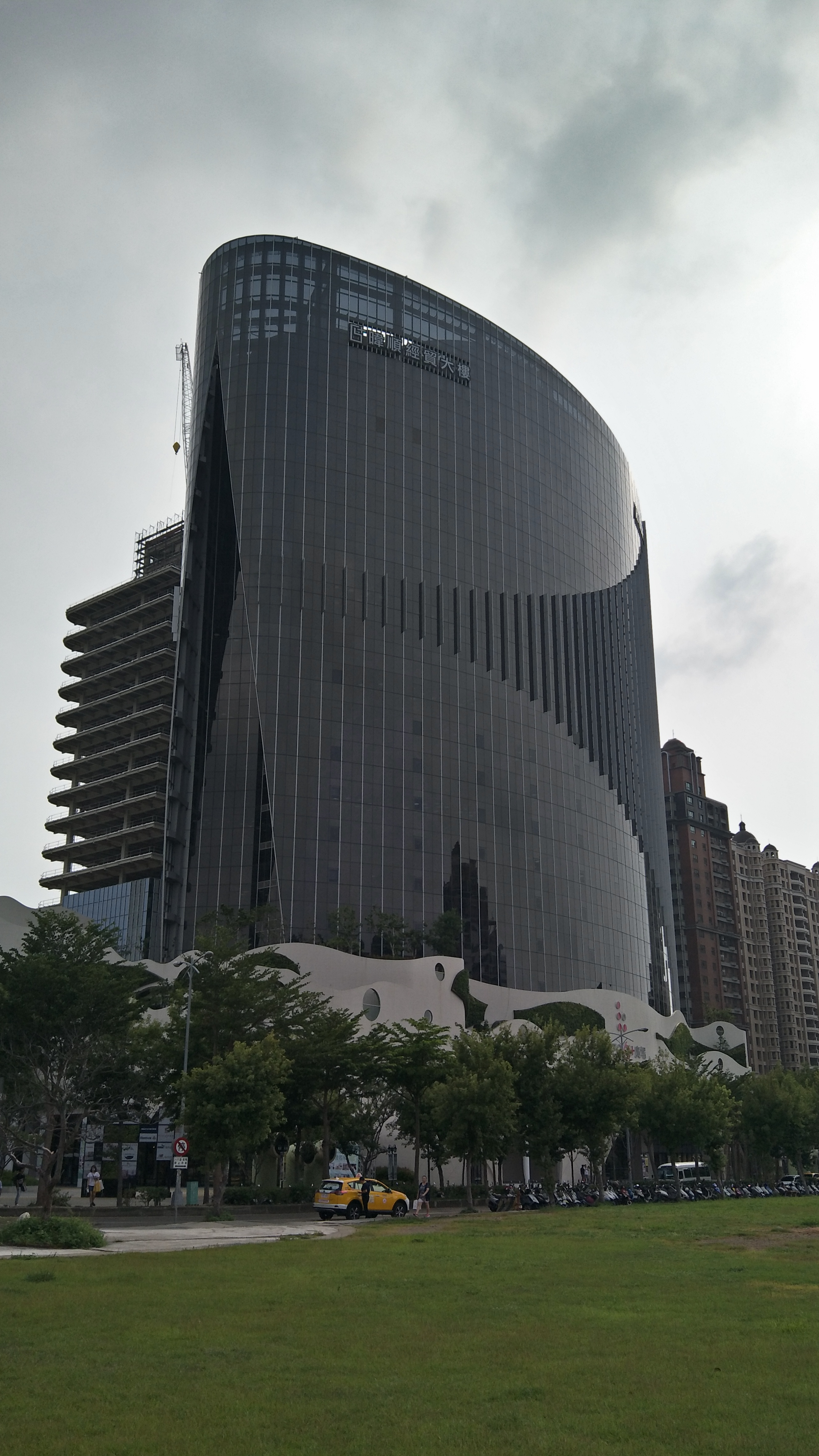
- Location: No. 168, Section 2, Fuxingsan Road, Zhubei City, Hsinchu County, Taiwan
- Coordinates: 24.80767463770289°N 121.03884455522481°E
- Opened: 26 January 2018
- Floors: 5 floors above ground
- Public transit: Hsinchu HSR station, Liujia railway station
- Website: http://www.weixia.com.tw/WSWebsite/

6+Plaza (Chinese: 6+Plaza購物廣場) is a shopping mall complex located in Zhubei City, Hsinchu County, Taiwan that started trial operations on 28 December 2017 and officially opened on 26 January 2018. It is the first and largest shopping mall in Hsinchu County and is located in close proximity to Hsinchu HSR station. The mall has many popular brands, informal eateries as well as kids' activities, such as go-karting. The mall is a part of a highrise complex named 暐順經貿大樓 that includes a mall (Levels 1 - 5), office spaces (Levels 6 - 13) as well as a hotel (Levels 14 - 20).

== See also ==
- List of tourist attractions in Taiwan
