= Liujia line =

Railway line in Taiwan

Liujia Line 六家線
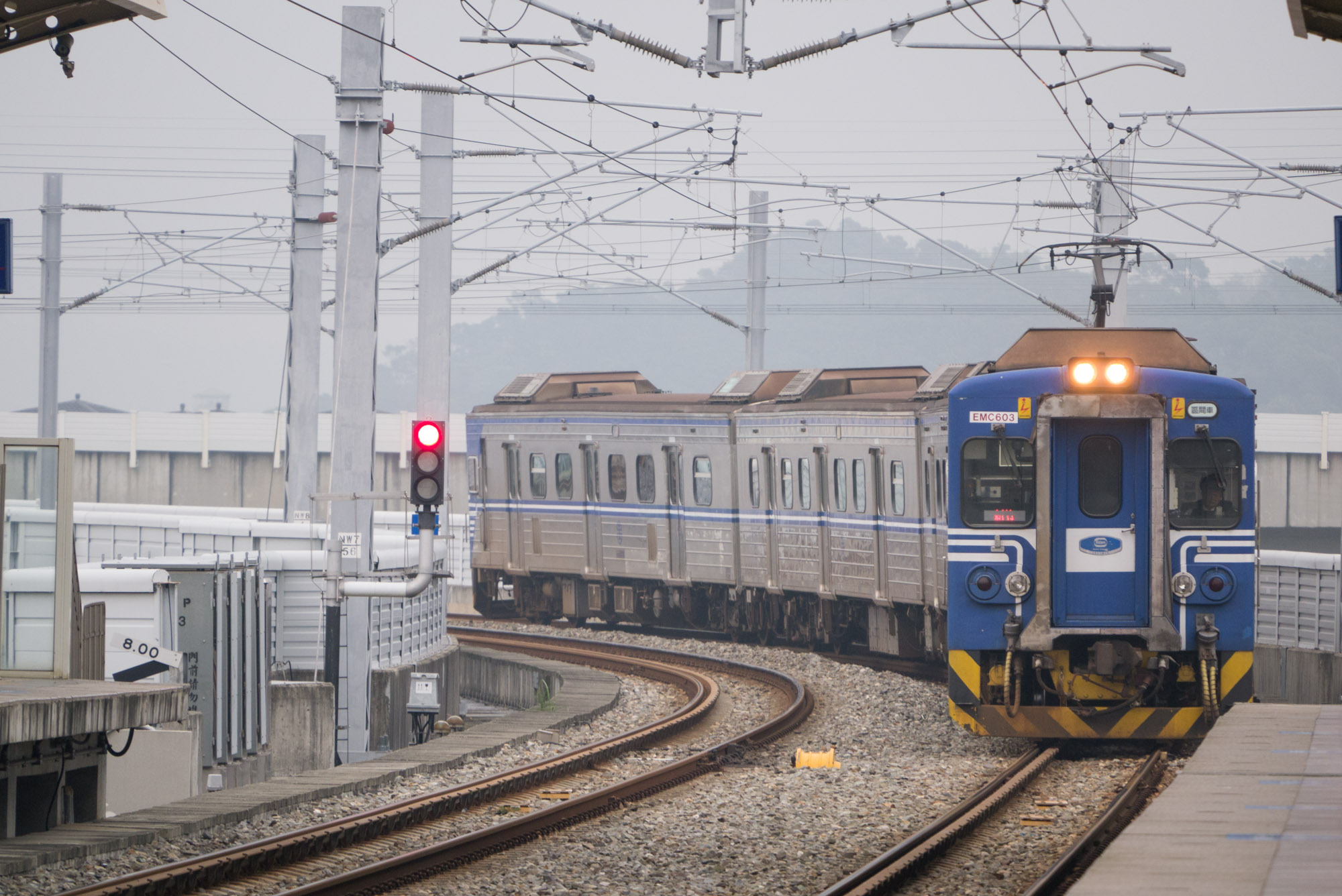

Overview
- Status: In service
- Owner: Taiwan Railway Administration
- Locale: Hsinchu County, Taiwan
- Termini: Zhuzhong, Zhudong; Liujia, Zhubei
- Stations: 2

Service
- Type: Heavy rail
- System: Taiwan Railway Administration

Technical
- Line length: 3.1 km (1.9 mi)
- Track gauge: 3 ft 6 in (1,067 mm) narrow gauge

The Liujia Line (Chinese: 六家線; pinyin: Liùjiā Xiàn) is a branch line of Taiwan Railway Western Line. It is located in Hsinchu County, Taiwan. It was built to link the Western Line to the THSR's Hsinchu Station, speeding up transit times between the two forms of rail service and, by extension, downtown Hsinchu City. The opening of the line experienced slight delays and eventually opened in November 2011.

== Stations ==
Name	Chinese	Taiwanese	Hakka	Distance	Transfers and notes	Location	
Zhuzhong	竹中	Tek-tiong	Chuk-chûng	0 km	→ Neiwan line to West Coast line	Zhudong	Hsinchu; County
Liujia	六家	Lio̍k-ka	Liuk-kâ	3.1 km	Hsinchu HSR station	Zhubei	Hsinchu; County
