= Neiwan Theater =

Theater and restaurant in Hengshan, Hsinchu County, Taiwan

- 內灣戲院
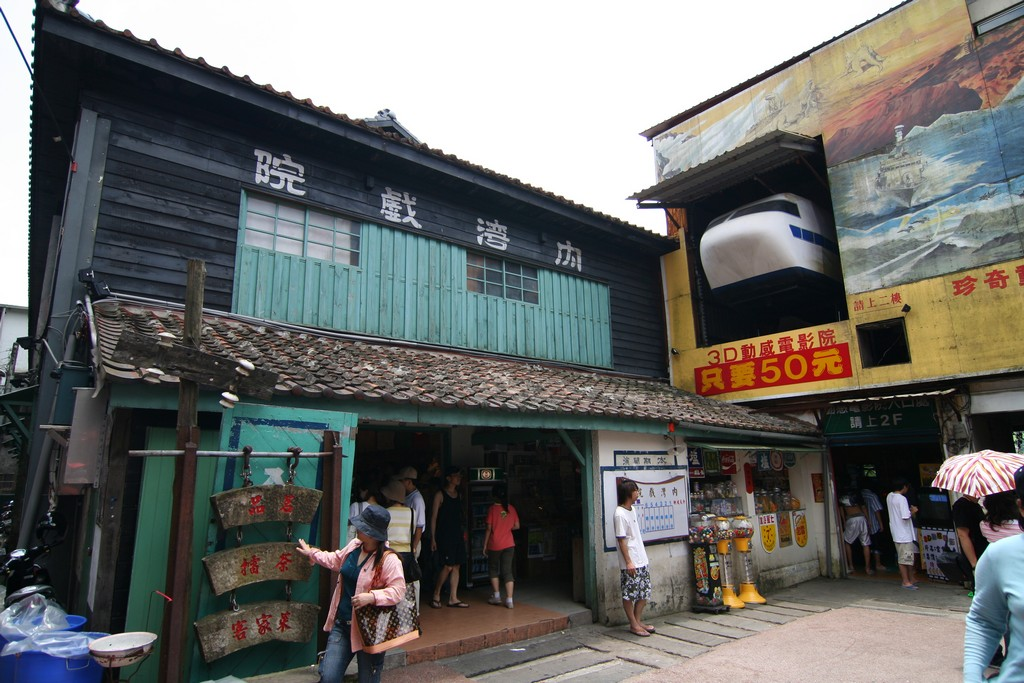
- Interactive map of Neiwan Theater
- Location: Hengshan, Hsinchu County, Taiwan
- Coordinates: 24°42′20.2″N 121°10′52.3″E
- Type: movie theater, restaurant

Construction
- Renovated: 2002

The Neiwan Theater (traditional Chinese: 內灣戲院; simplified Chinese: 内湾戏院; pinyin: Nèiwān Xìyuàn) is a movie theater and restaurant in Neiwan Village, Hengshan Township, Hsinchu County, Taiwan.

== History ==
The theater was originally constructed in 1950 from an old lumber yard. In 2002, it was renovated and a restaurant was added.

== Architecture ==
The theater is a two-story building.

== Transportation ==
The museum is accessible within walking distance west from Neiwan Station of the Taiwan Railway.

== See also ==
- Cinema of Taiwan
