= Hengshan, Hsinchu =

Rural township in Hsinchu County, Taiwan

Coordinates: 24°42′36″N 121°8′13″E

Hengshan Township 橫山鄉 Yokoyama
- Rural township
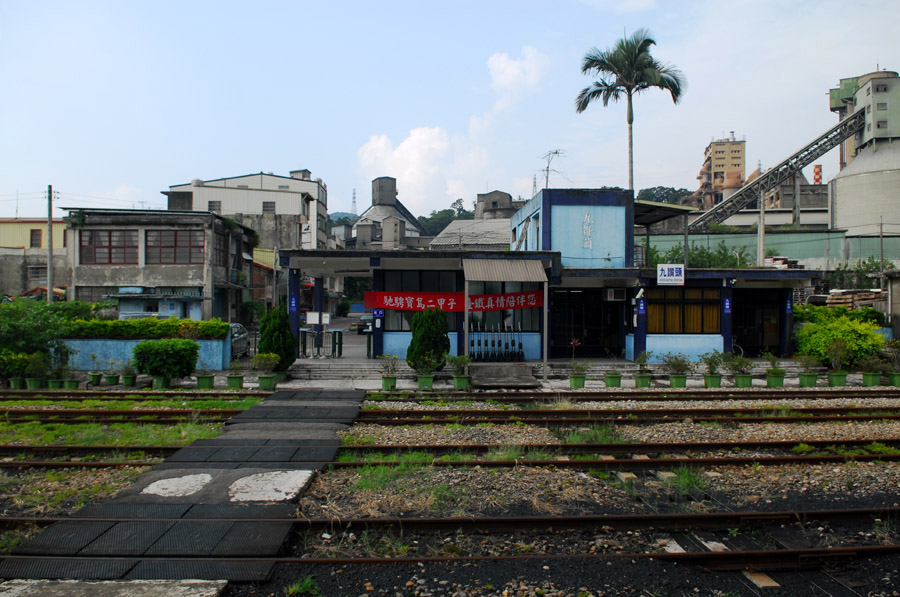

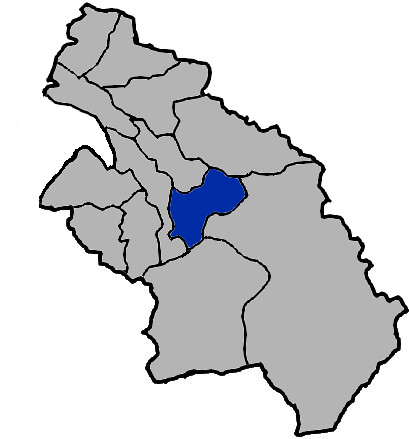
- Hengshan Township in Hsinchu County
- Location: Hsinchu County, Taiwan

Area
  - Total: 66 km^{2} (25 sq mi)

Population (March 2023)
  - Total: 12,208
  - Density: 180/km^{2} (480/sq mi)
- Website: hengshan.hsinchu.gov.tw/Default.aspx (in Chinese)

Hengshan Township (Chinese: 橫山鄉; pinyin: Héngshān Xiāng) is a rural township in Hsinchu County, Taiwan. It had an estimated population of 12,208 as of March 2023.

== Administrative divisions ==
Dadu, Fengtian, Fengxiang, Fuxing, Hengshan, Lixing, Nanchang, Neiwan, Shakeng, Tianliao and Xinxing Village.

== Tourist attractions ==
- Liu Hsing-chin Comic Museum
- Neiwan Theater

== Transportation ==
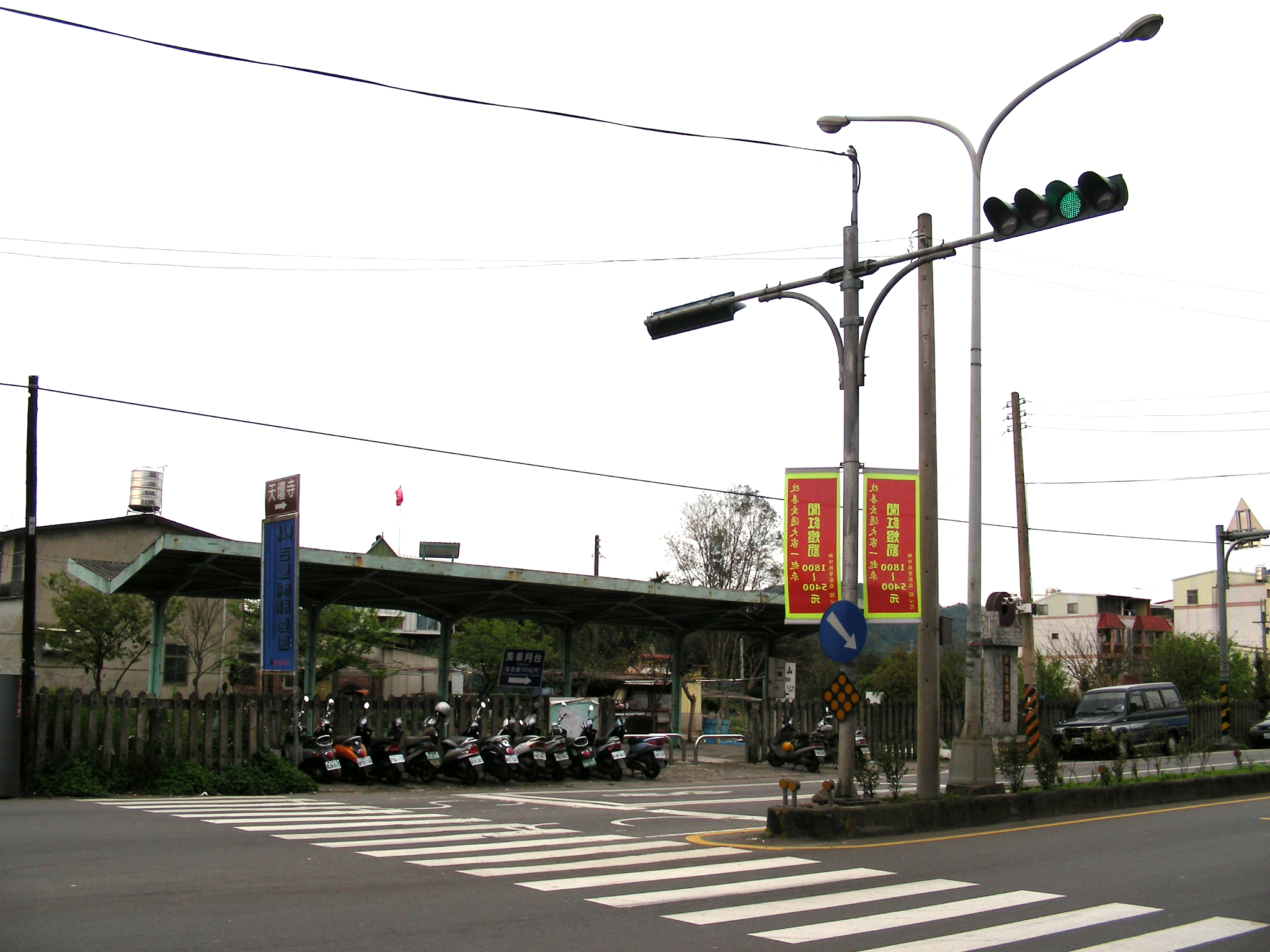
Hengshan Station

- Taiwan Railway Fugui Station, Hengshan Station, Hexing Station, Jiuzantou Station and Neiwan Station.
