= Hsinchu railway station =

Railway station in Hsinchu, Taiwan

Hsinchu 新竹
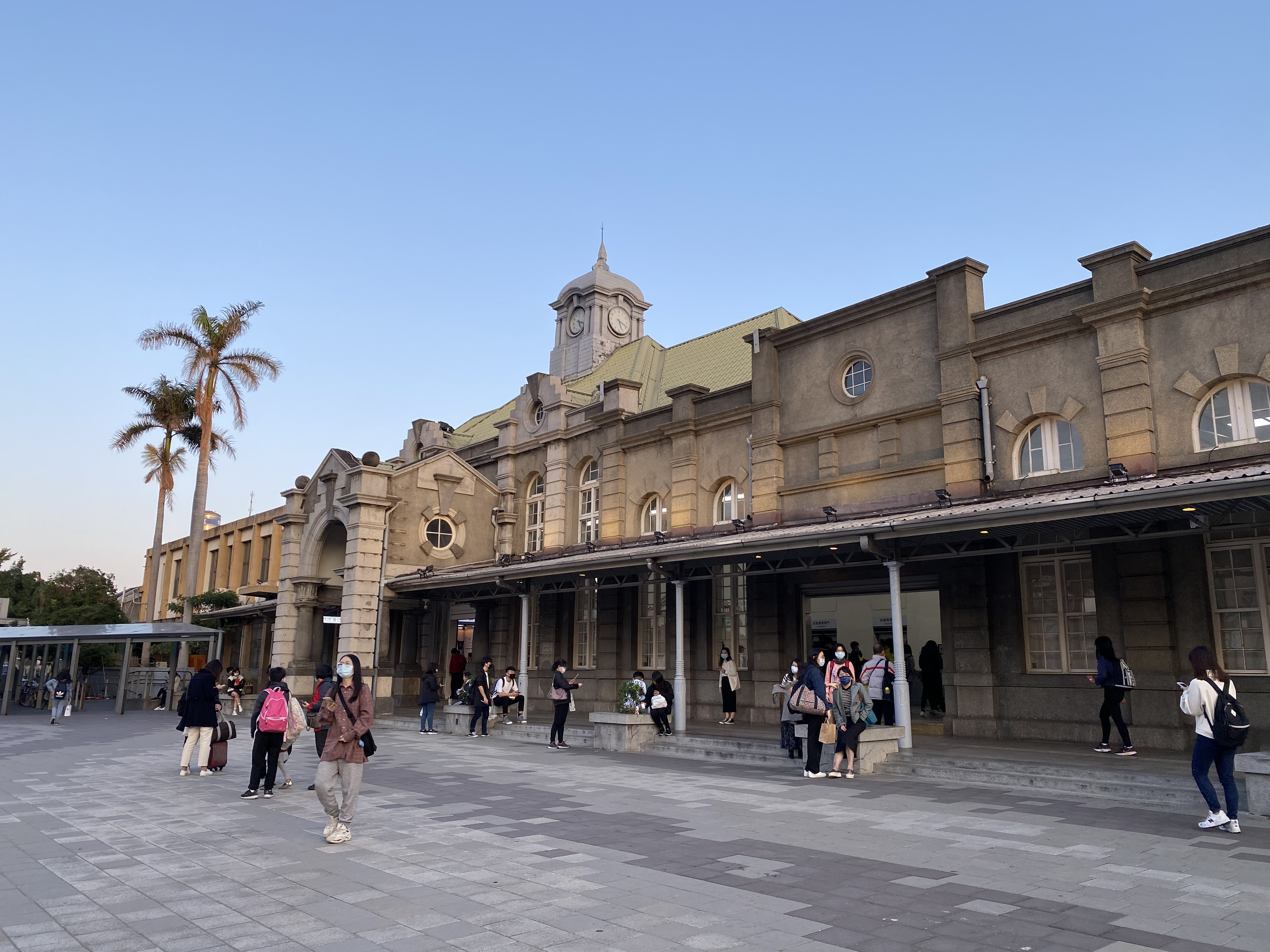

Chinese name
- Traditional Chinese: 新竹
Transcriptions
Standard Mandarin
- Hanyu Pinyin: Xīnzhú
- Bopomofo: ㄒㄧㄣ ㄓㄨˊ
- Wade–Giles: Hsin¹-chu²
Hakka
- Romanization: Xín-zùg (Sixian dialect); Sìn-zhug (Hailu dialect)
Southern Min
- Tâi-lô: Sin-tik

General information
- Location: 445 Sec 2 Zhonghua Rd; East District, Hsinchu City; Taiwan
- Coordinates: 24.8016°N 120.9716°E
- System: Taiwan Railway railway station
- Line: Western Trunk line
- Distance: 106.4 km to Keelung
- Connections: Local bus; Coach

Construction
- Structure type: Ground level

Other information
- Station code: 115 (three-digit); 1025 (four-digit); A29 (statistical)
- Classification: First class (Chinese: 一等)
- Website: www.railway.gov.tw/Hsinchu/ (in Chinese)

History
- Opened: 30 October 1893
- Rebuilt: 1913
- Electrified: 9 January 1978
- Former names: Shinchiku (Japanese: 新竹)

Passengers
- 2017: 15.020 million per year ▲0.86%
- Rank: 7 out of 228

Services
Preceding station	Taiwan Railway	Following station
North Hsinchu towards Keelung	Western Trunk line	Sanxingqiao towards Kaohsiung
Terminus	Neiwan line	North Hsinchu towards Neiwan
Location
- Location within Taiwan

Hsinchu (Chinese: 新竹; pinyin: Xīnzhú; Wade–Giles: Hsin¹-chu²) is a railway station in East District, Hsinchu City, Taiwan, served by Taiwan Railway. Hsinchu Station is a major station on the West Coast line and the western terminus of the Neiwan line.

== Structure ==
There are two island platforms and one side platform, as well as the historic fourth-generation European-style station building which opened in 1913, during Japanese rule.

== Service ==
Except Tzu-Chiang Limited Express southbound 133, 143, northbound 138, and some Taroko Expresses, all other trains stop at Hsinchu Station. It is also the main destination of commuter local trains in Northern Taiwan. Neiwan line trains travel from this station to Neiwan Station. Connection to the THSR Hsinchu Station is available through Liujia line (which branches off from the Neiwan line's Zhuzhong Station).

== Around the station ==
- Black Bat Squadron Memorial Hall
- Hsinchu City Art Site of Railway Warehouse
- Hsinchu City Performance Hall
- Immaculate Heart of Mary Cathedral
- National Hsinchu Living Arts Center

== Sister stations ==
Hsinchu Station has "sister station" agreements with Grand Central Terminal in USA since August 2013 and with Tokyo Station in Japan since February 12, 2015.

== See also ==
- List of railway stations in Taiwan
