= Neiwan railway station =

Railway station in Hengshan, Hsinchu County, Taiwan

Neiwan Station 內灣車站
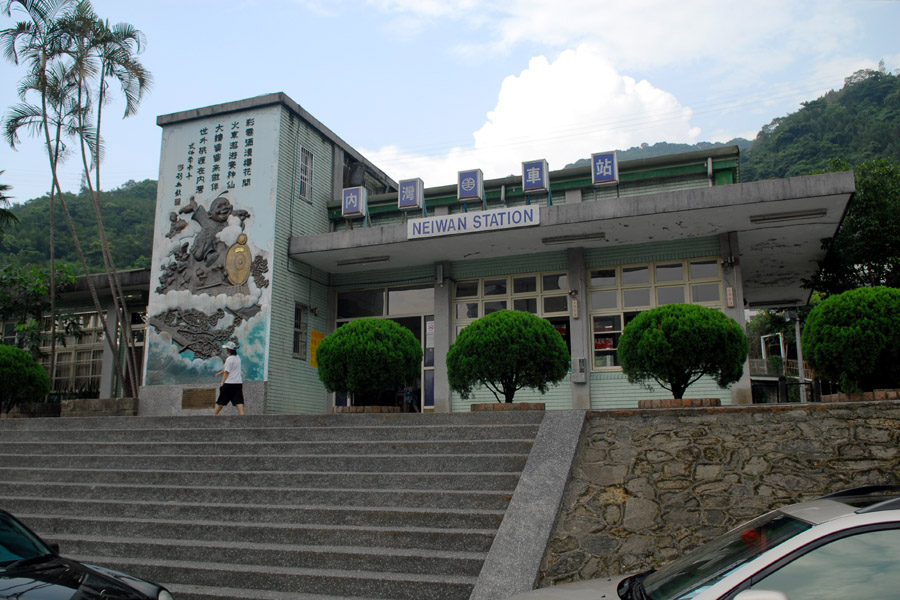

General information
- Location: Hengshan, Hsinchu County, Taiwan
- Coordinates: 24°42′19.5″N 121°10′56.9″E
- System: Train station
- Owner: Taiwan Railway Corporation
- Operator: Taiwan Railway Corporation
- Line: Neiwan
- Train operators: Taiwan Railway Corporation

History
- Opened: 11 September 1951

Passengers
- 895 daily (2024)

Services
Preceding station	Taiwan Railway	Following station
Fugui towards Hsinchu	Neiwan line	Terminus
Location

Neiwan (traditional Chinese: 內灣車站; simplified Chinese: 内湾车站; pinyin: Nèiwān Chēzhàn) is a railway station on Taiwan Railway Neiwan line located in Hengshan Township, Hsinchu County, Taiwan.

== History ==
The station was opened on 11 September 1951.

== Around the station ==
- Liu Hsing-chin Comic Museum
- Neiwan Theater

== Nearby stations ==
Fugui <-- Neiwan line

== See also ==
- List of railway stations in Taiwan
