= 2013 in Taiwan =

- Decades: 1990s; 2000s; 2010s; 2020s
- See also: Other events of 2013: History of Taiwan; Timeline; Years

Events from the year 2013 in Taiwan, Republic of China. This year is numbered Minguo 102 according to the official Republic of China calendar.

== Incumbents ==
- President – Ma Ying-jeou
- Vice President – Wu Den-yih
- Premier – Jiang Yi-huah
- Vice Premier – Mao Chi-kuo

== Events ==
=== January ===
- 1 January
  - The establishment of Customs Administration of the Ministry of Finance.
  - The establishment of K-12 Education Administration of the Ministry of Education.
  - The renaming of Sports Affairs Council to Sports Administration of the Ministry of Education.
  - The renaming of Department of Education to K-12 Education Administration of the Ministry of Education.
  - The renaming of National Youth Commission to Youth Development Administration and being put under the Ministry of Education.

=== February ===
- 21 February – The opening of Hsinchu Taiwan Pavilion Expo Park in East District, Hsinchu City.

=== March ===
- 14 March – The opening of Embassy of Tuvalu in Taipei.
- 27 March - The 5.9 M_{w} Nantou earthquake affected the island with a maximum Mercalli intensity of V (Moderate). One person was killed and 97 were injured.

=== May ===
- 1 May – The opening of Chelungpu Fault Preservation Park in Zhushan Township, Nantou County.
- 3 May – The upgrade approval for Taoyuan County to become special municipality from county.
- 9 May – The first meeting of the China Affairs Committee of Democratic Progressive Party.
- 31 May – The opening of Embassy of Kiribati in Taipei.

=== June ===
- 2 June - June 2013 Nantou earthquake.
- 9 June – The official opening of At-Taqwa Mosque in Taoyuan County.
- 13 June – The completion of Xinzhuang Joint Office Tower in Xinzhuang District, New Taipei.
- 29 June – The opening of Danfeng Station of Taipei Metro in Xinzhuang District and Taishan District, New Taipei.

=== July ===
- 4 July – Death of Hung Chung-chiu.
- 7–14 July – Typhoon Soulik.
- 20 July – 2013 Kuomintang chairmanship election.
- 23 July – The establishment of the Ministry of Health and Welfare from the former Department of Health.
- 29 July – The opening of Kaisyuan Night Market in Cianjhen District, Kaohsiung City.

=== August ===
- The establishment of University of Taipei from the merger of Taipei Municipal University of Education and Taipei Physical Education College.

=== September ===
- 16–22 September – 2013 OEC Kaohsiung

=== October ===
- 2013 Taiwan food scandal.
- 1 October – Huang Lin-kai, an active-duty conscript, murders his former girlfriend and her mother in New Taipei City. He is subsequently sentenced to death and executed in January 2025.
- 5 October – The opening of Guchuan Bridge in Pingtung County.
- 10 October – The 102nd anniversary of the National Day of the Republic of China.
- 24 October – The official opening of Asia Museum of Modern Art in Wufeng District, Taichung.
- 27 October – The opening of Shanshuilu Eco Park in Nangang District, Taipei.

=== November ===
- 3–11 November – Typhoon Haiyan.
- 10 November – 19th National Congress of Kuomintang in Taichung.
- 14 November – The Gambia cut diplomatic relations with the Republic of China.
- 18 November – The ROC officially terminated its diplomatic relations with The Gambia.
- 24 November – The opening of Xinyi Line of Taipei Metro.

== Deaths ==
- 18 February – Chu Hsing-yu, 56, Taiwanese politician, MLY (1993–2005), heart attack.
- 13 April – Lin Yang-kang, 85, Taiwanese politician, President of Judicial Yuan (1987–1994).
- 29 April – Levi Ying, 64, Taiwanese-American politician, MLY (1999–2002).
- 6 May – Yang Tzuo-chow, 84, Taiwanese politician, MLY (1999–2002).
- 19 June – Kuo Liang-hui, Taiwanese novelist.
- 13 October – Umar Hartono, 91, Taiwanese soldier (Indonesian National Revolution).
