= Hsinchu Pei Ying Junior High School =

- 新竹市立培英國民中學
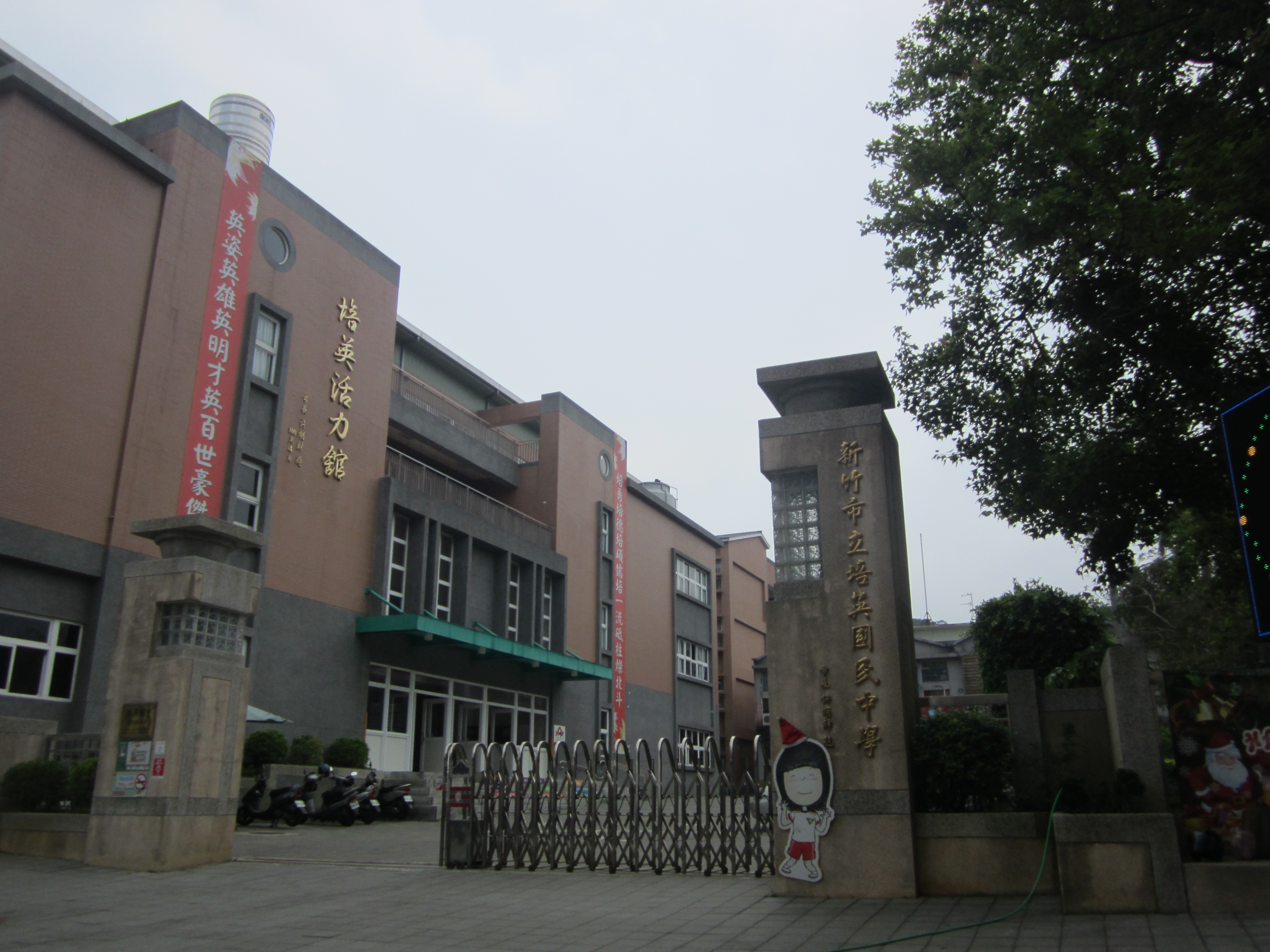
- East, Hsinchu City, Taiwan

Information
- Type: Junior high school
- Established: 17 April 1956
- Website: www.pijh.hc.edu.tw (in Chinese)

Hsinchu Pei Ying junior high school, officially the Pei Ying junior high school, Hsinchu City (Chinese: 新竹市立培英國民中學). It is at No. 4, Xuefu Road, East District, Hsinchu City, Taiwan.

== Area ==
Its area is about 3.9 ha.

== History ==
The school is the former position of Japanese Dong Shan Elementary School (東山小學校).

The school founded on April 17 of 1956.

Moved to the present position in August 1957.

Renamed as Pei Ying junior high school Hsinchu County (新竹縣立培英國民中學) in 1968.

Renamed as Pei Ying junior high school Hsinchu City (新竹市立培英國民中學) in 1982.

== Building Introduction ==
Name	Floors	Introduction	Remarks
Building A	3 floors		Grade 7 use it.
Building B	3 floors (Western section)，2 floors (Eastern section)		Grade 8 use its western section.
Building C	3 floors (Western section)，2 floors (Eastern section)		
Building D	3 floors		
Science Building	4 floors and 1 basement	The B1 is billiard room.	
Chung Cheng Building (中正堂)	Unknown	There are housekeeping classroom and canteen in it.	Its present position is Energy Building.
emPower the Young Building (Building G, 活力館)	2 floors and 1 basement	The B1 is parking lot.	
New Building (Building F, 新大樓)	4 floors		Grade 9 use it.
Unknown	2 floors and 1 basement (Note: Gap between high and low there, so we can also say "It have three floors.")	The B1 is canteen., (Note: Chung Cheng Building before demolition, it was a warehouse. Because Chung Cheng Building demolished, canteen moved here.) Lunch Kitchen on the 1F, and teachers' office on the 2F.	

== Campus landscape ==
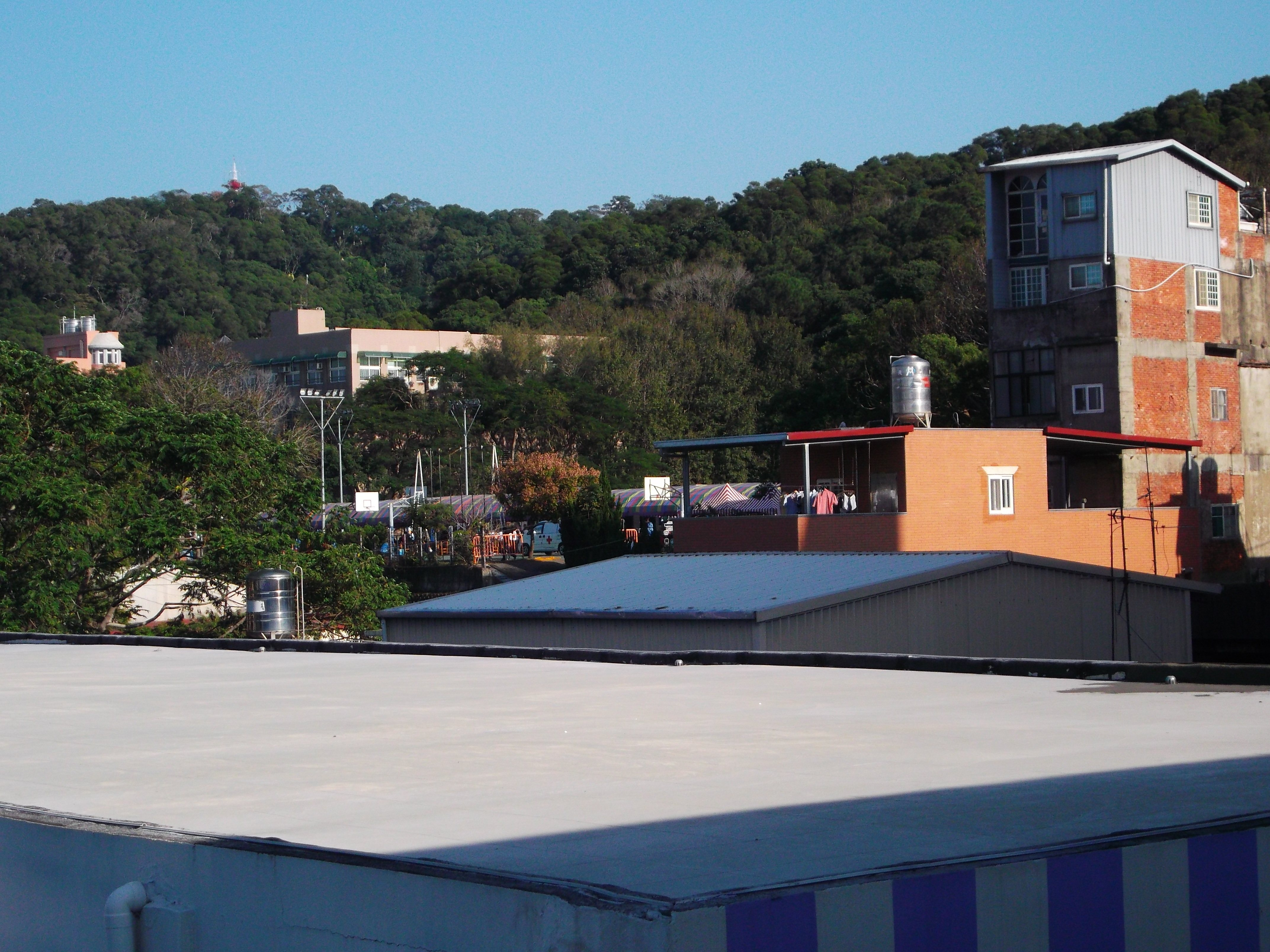
58 anniversary of the venue (shooting from the Science Building)

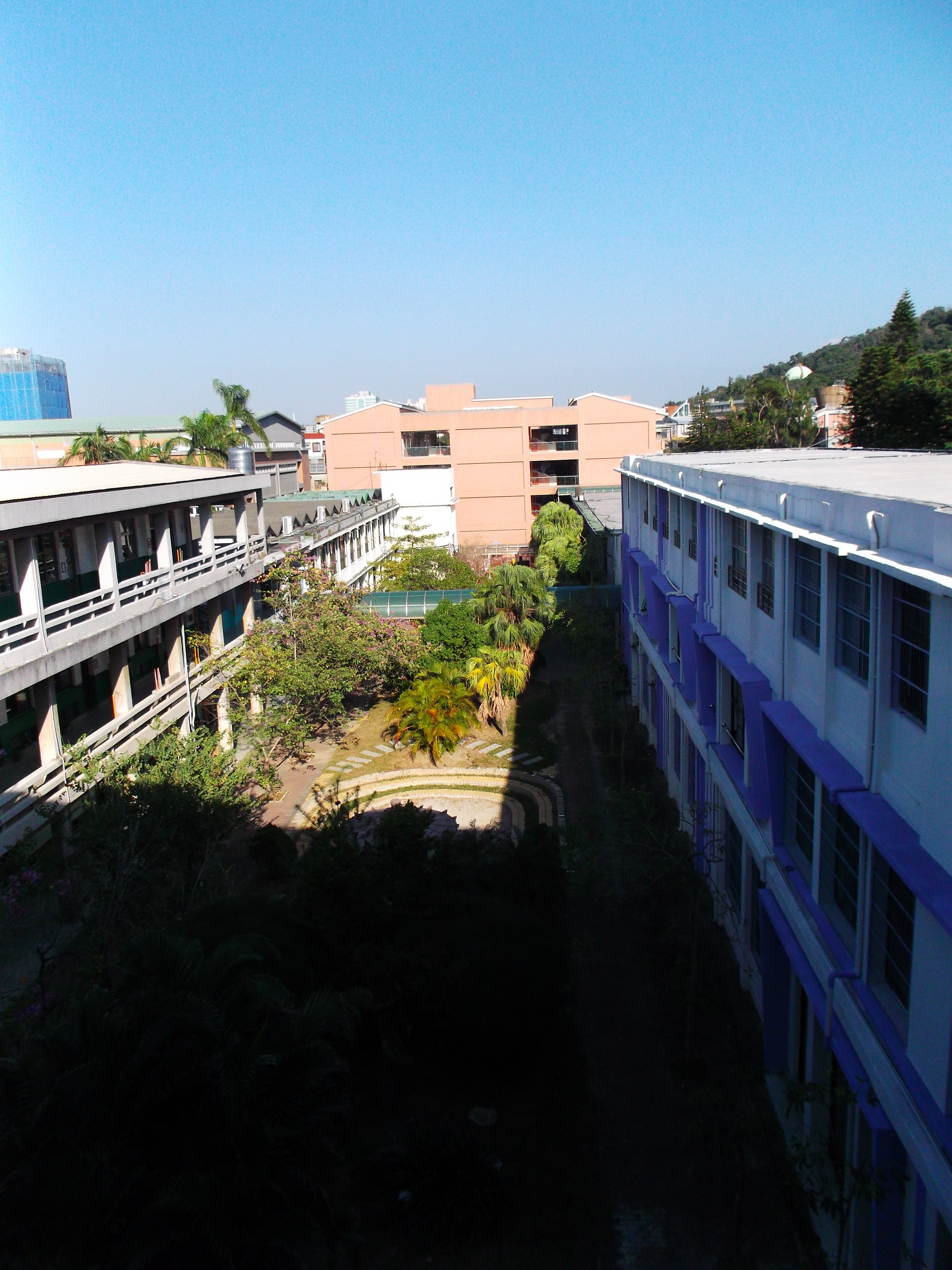
Building B (left), New Building (middle), Building C (right)

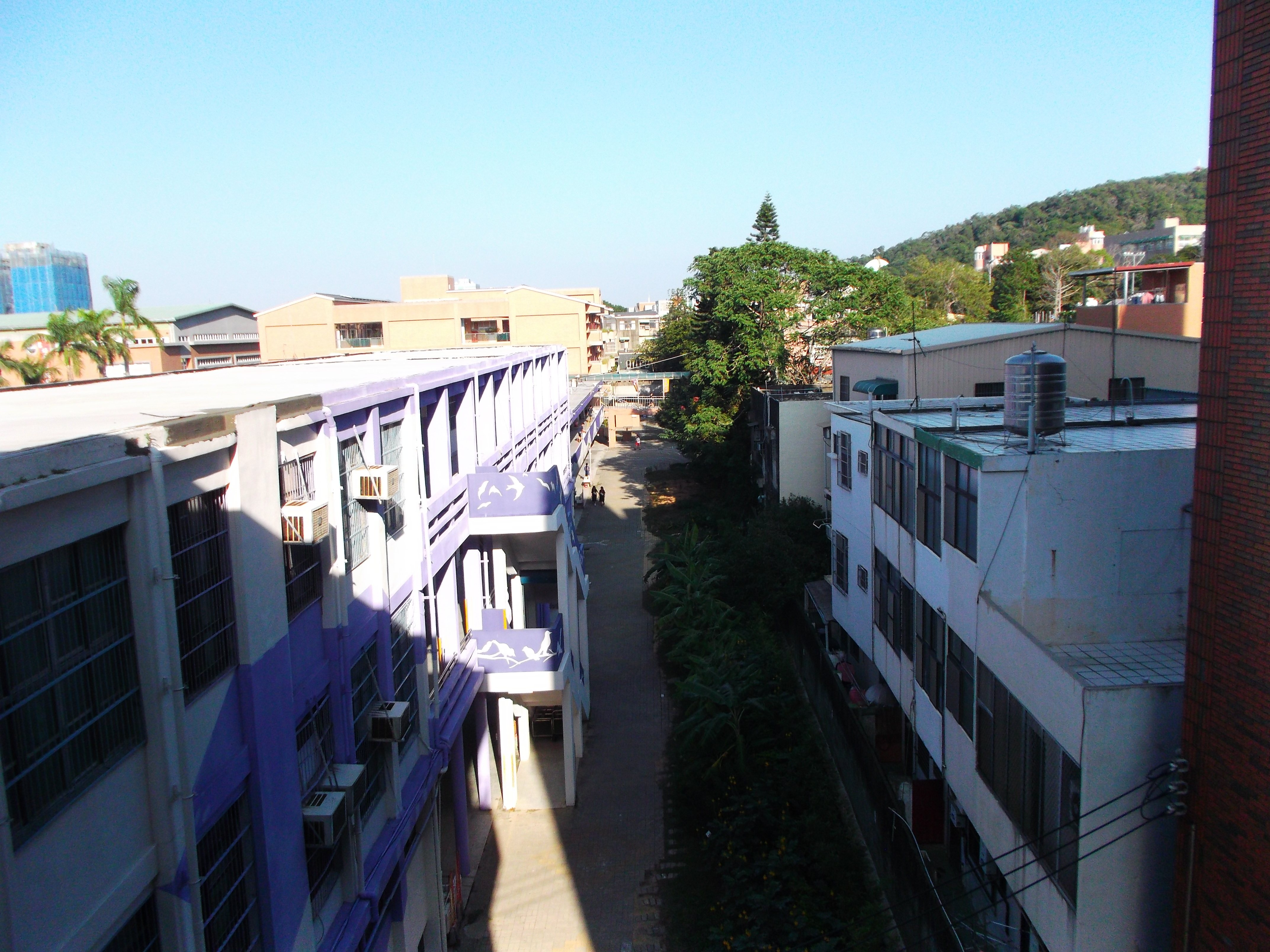
Building C (left), on the right is the houses

== See also ==
- Education in Taiwan
