= Image Museum of Hsinchu City =

East, Hsinchu City, Taiwan

- 新竹市文化局影像博物館
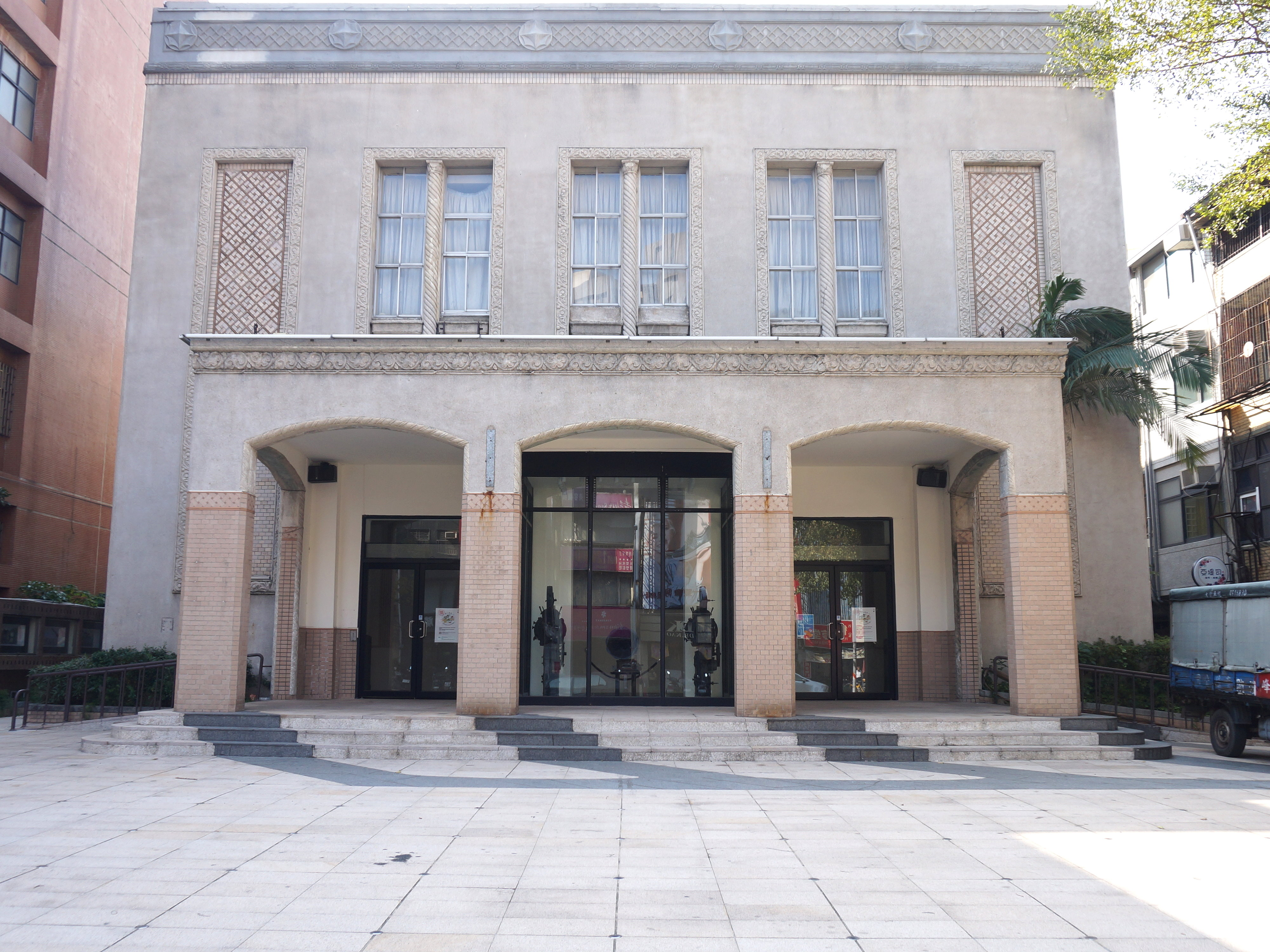
- Established: 21 May 2000
- Location: East, Hsinchu City, Taiwan
- Coordinates: 24°48′18″N 120°58′11″E
- Type: museum
- Public transit access: Hsinchu Station

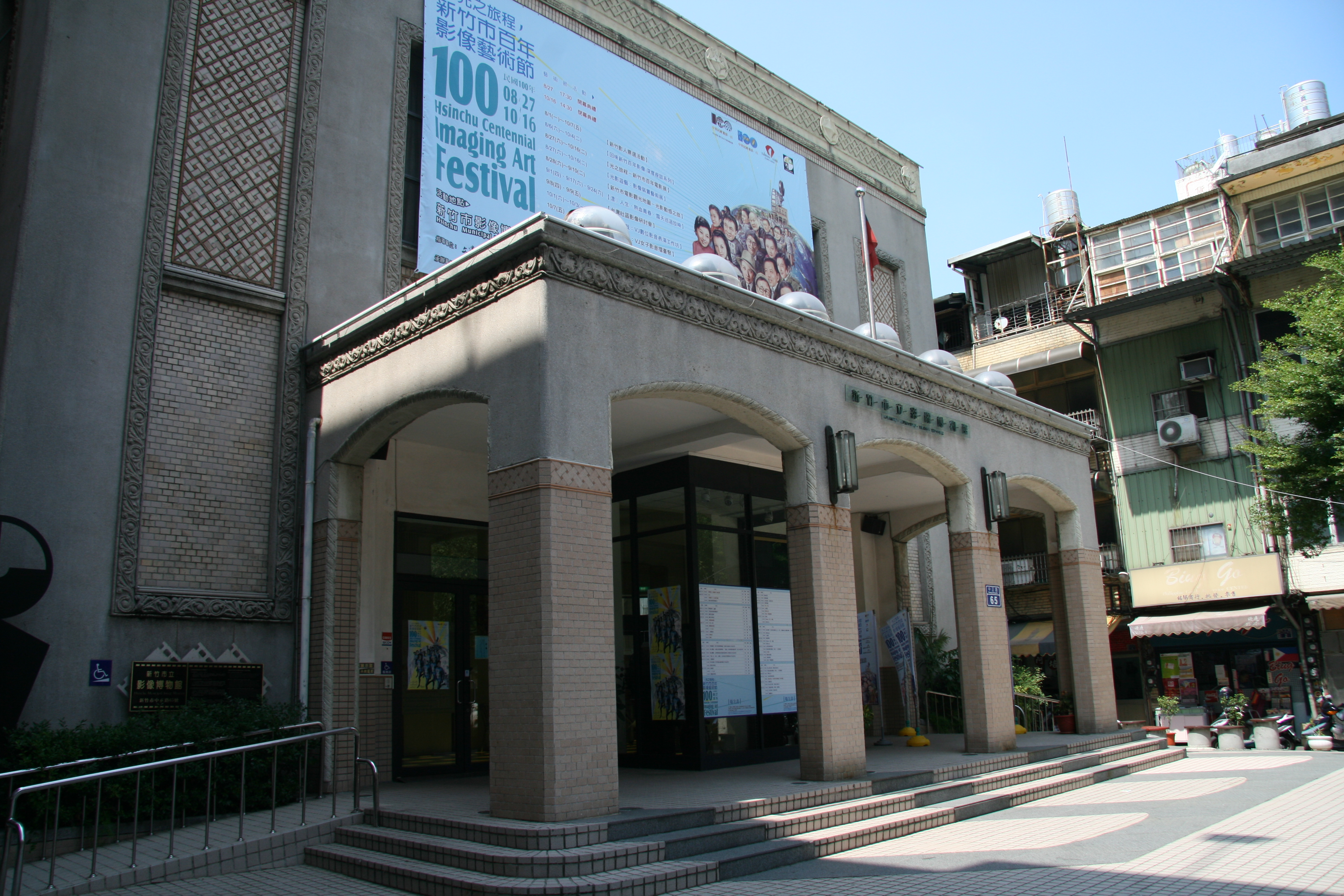
100 Hsinchu Centennial Imaging Art Festival

The Image Museum of Hsinchu City (traditional Chinese: 新竹市文化局影像博物館; simplified Chinese: 新竹市文化局影像博物馆; pinyin: Xīnzhúshì Wénhuàjú Yǐngxiàng Bówùguǎn) is a museum about cinema in East District, Hsinchu City, Taiwan.

== History ==
The museum building was initially built in 1933 as the Hsinchu Municipal Theater or Yule Theater. It was the first luxury theater at that time with air conditioner in Taiwan with a capacity of 500 audiences. In 1944, the second floor of the building was heavily damaged by aerial bombing during the Second Sino-Japanese War by the Allied Forces.

In 1945 after the handover of Taiwan to China, the theater was rebuilt and opened as the Kuomin Theater in 1946. It subsequently attracted huge crowds as a movie house. It was used as a venue for concert halls and even army recruitment drive. Due to its declining profits contributed from the increasing usage of rental videos, the theater had remained idle for several years since 1991.

The theater was reopened in 1996 to service the Hsinchu City venue for cultural events organized as part of the national arts festival. The reopening sparked renewed interest among local movie-related people. Subsequently, the Chinese Taipei Film Archive was commissioned to draft plan for the establishment of the Image Museum at the theater. In 1998, the Council for Cultural Affairs provided funding for the yearlong restoration project. On 21 May 2000 the Image Museum was finally opened and the building was renamed the same as the museum.

The image museum had been closed since the outbreak of COVID-19 pandemic until it was reopened on January 22, 2022, and was renamed as Huo Zer Lightbox.

== Mission ==
The purpose of the museum is to preserve the cultural experience of the Kuomin Theater and to serve as a shared image space for the city residents. The museum was also built to promote and show the reminiscent and older movies, as well as to archive, display, do research on cinema-related items and promote cinematography.

From January 22, 2022, under the name of Lightbox the mission of the image museum has been upgraded to become the combination of a movie theater, exhibitions of film-related historical records and books, a restaurant and bar for social gatherings of movie fans.

== Architecture ==
The style of building as a whole is a mixture of classical Roman and Arabian architecture, with a wide open square on the front and a newly-constructed 4-floor building on the back. The movie theater is on the ground floor with a decker on the second floor, as well as two indoors balconies along the side walls of the hall; furthermore, on both sides of the building there are two fire-protection lanes that separate the movie theater from the neighboring buildings which is not a common design for safety reason compared with the other movie theaters' design in Hsinchu City.

== Exhibition ==
The museum often holds movie exhibitions to promote humanistic and artistic films, as well as reminiscent films that were made independently by Taiwanese producers. It has been used to collect the movie-related cultural products, display the exhibitions of historical records, and hold the seminars from researchers and education-oriented activities.

== Activities ==
The museum has held many activities such as the Animated Cartoon Camp, Movie Study Meeting and Camp for Cultivation of Documentary Capabilities.

Starting from January 22, 2022, the Lightbox has combined and operated at least three kinds of activities or functions that include playing current art-related movies or documentaries from international films festival, a bookstore and film-related historical records displaying, a bar and restaurant.

== Transportation ==
The museum is accessible within walking distance northwest from Hsinchu Station of the Taiwan Railway.

== See also ==
- List of museums in Taiwan
