= Hsinchu Taiwan Pavilion Expo Park =

Former pavilion in East, Hsinchu City, Taiwan

- 新竹市世博台灣館
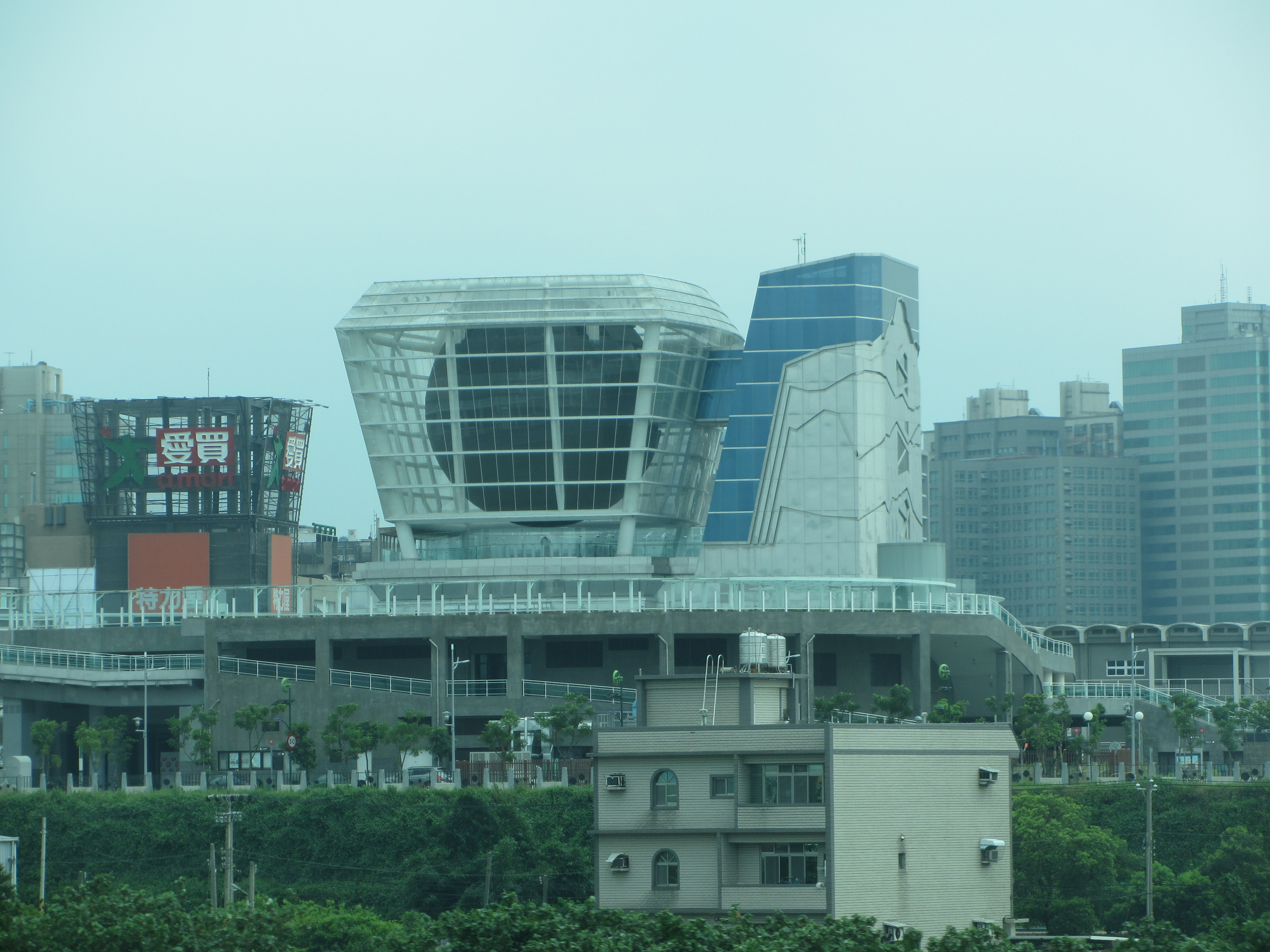
- Interactive map of the Hsinchu Taiwan Pavilion Expo Park area

General information
- Location: East, Hsinchu City, Taiwan
- Coordinates: 24°48′22.8″N 120°59′35.0″E
- Opened: 21 February 2013

The Hsinchu Taiwan Pavilion Expo Park (traditional Chinese: 新竹市世博台灣館; simplified Chinese: 新竹市世博台湾馆; pinyin: Xīnzhú Shì Shìbó Táiwān Guǎn) was a pavilion in East District, Hsinchu City, Taiwan.

== History ==
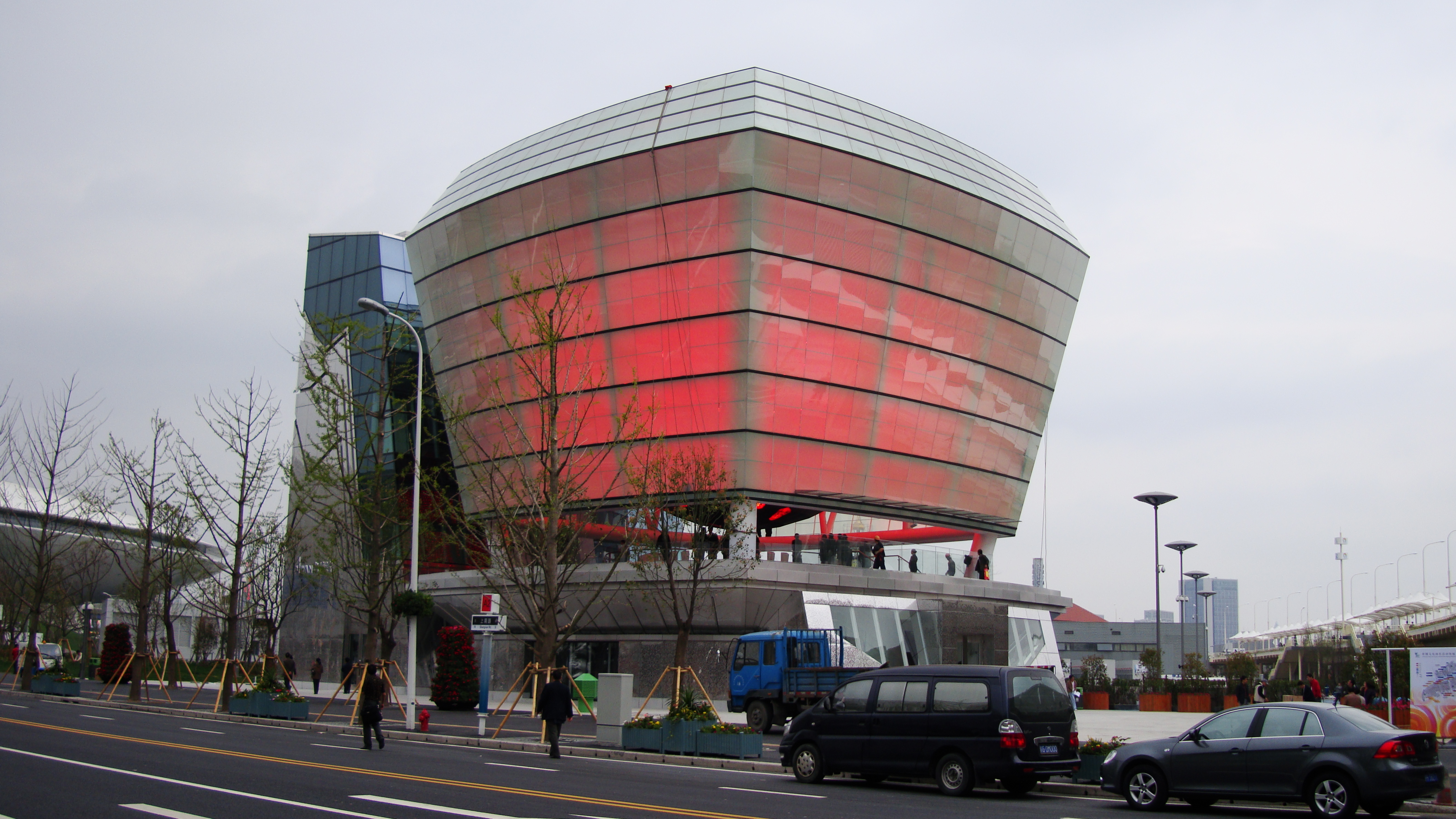
Taiwan Pavilion at Expo 2010 Shanghai China

The pavilion used to be the Taiwan Pavilion at Expo 2010 Shanghai China in Shanghai in April–October 2010. It was moved and reopened in Hsinchu City on 21 February 2013. Afterwards, the Hsinchu City Government purchased the pavilion at a cost of more than NT$450 million. The building is now closed.

== Architecture ==
The pavilion resembled a traditional sky lantern with a height of four stories. It consisted of City Theme Hall, Sky Lantern Platform and Sky Theater.

== See also ==
- List of tourist attractions in Taiwan
