= Hsinchu City Art Site of Railway Warehouse =

Former warehouse in East, Hsinchu City, Taiwan

- 新竹市鐵道藝術村
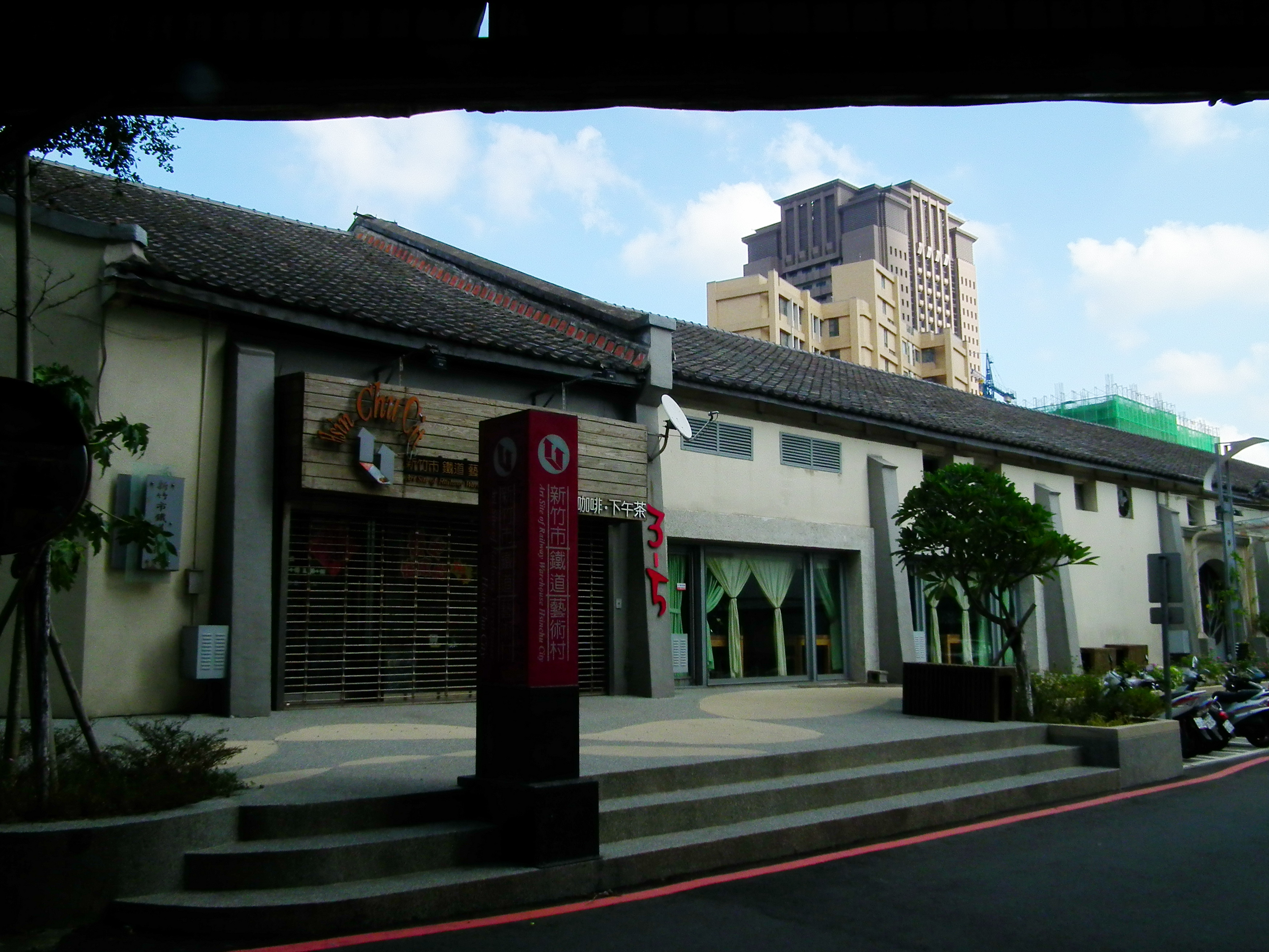
- Interactive map of Hsinchu City Art Site of Railway Warehouse
- Location: East, Hsinchu City, Taiwan
- Coordinates: 24°48′15.0″N 120°58′36.8″E
- Type: former warehouse

Construction
- Built: 1941
- Opened: 2004

The Hsinchu City Art Site of Railway Warehouse (traditional Chinese: 新竹市鐵道藝術村; simplified Chinese: 新竹市铁道艺术村; pinyin: Xīnzhú Shì Tiědào Yìshù Cūn) is a historical warehouse in East District, Hsinchu City, Taiwan.

== History ==
The building was originally constructed in 1941 as a station warehouse. In 2004, it was converted into the Hsinchu City Art Site of Railway Warehouse.

== Architecture ==
The building was constructed with Japanese style architecture. It consists of performance hall for exhibitions or events.

== Transportation ==
The building is accessible within walking distance northeast of Hsinchu Station of Taiwan Railway.

== See also ==
- List of tourist attractions in Taiwan
