= Aqueduct Museum of Hsinchu City =

Museum in East, Hsinchu City, Taiwan

- 新竹水道取水口展示館
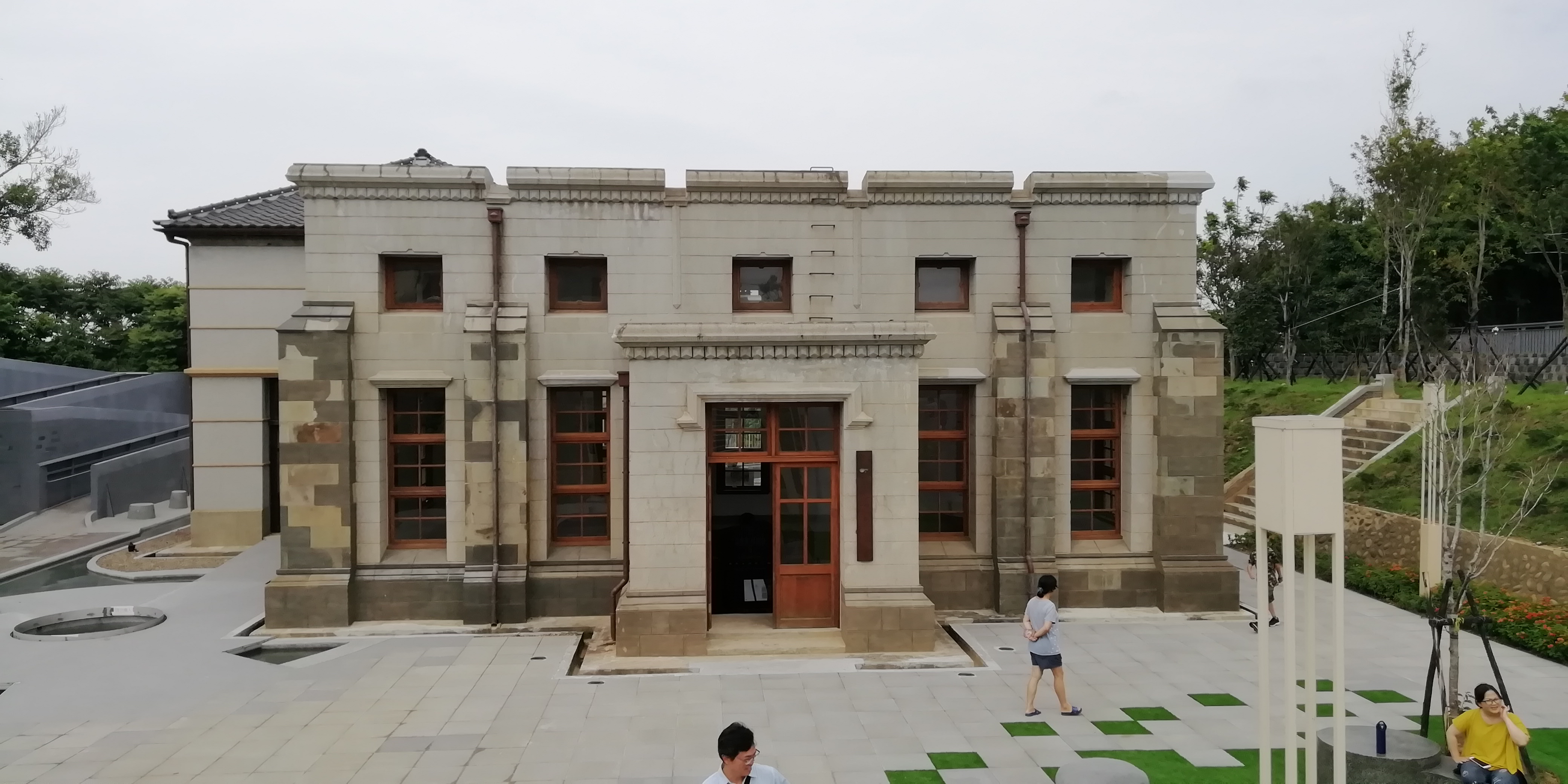
- Established: April 2019
- Location: East, Hsinchu City, Taiwan
- Coordinates: 24°48′21.8″N 120°59′40.3″E
- Type: museum
- Public transit access: North Hsinchu Station

The Aqueduct Museum of Hsinchu City (traditional Chinese: 新竹水道取水口展示館; simplified Chinese: 新竹水道取水口展示馆; pinyin: Xīnzhú Shuǐdào Qǔshuǐ Kǒu Zhǎnshìguǎn) is a museum in East District, Hsinchu City, Taiwan.

== History ==
The museum was opened in April 2019.

== Exhibitions ==
The museum exhibits the history of water supply in Hsinchu City and about the museum building itself.

== Transportation ==
The museum is accessible within walking distance east of North Hsinchu Station of Taiwan Railway.

== See also ==
- List of museums in Taiwan
- Water supply and sanitation in Taiwan
