= Hsinchu Zoo =

Zoo in East, Hsinchu City, Taiwan

Hsinchu Zoo 新竹市立動物園
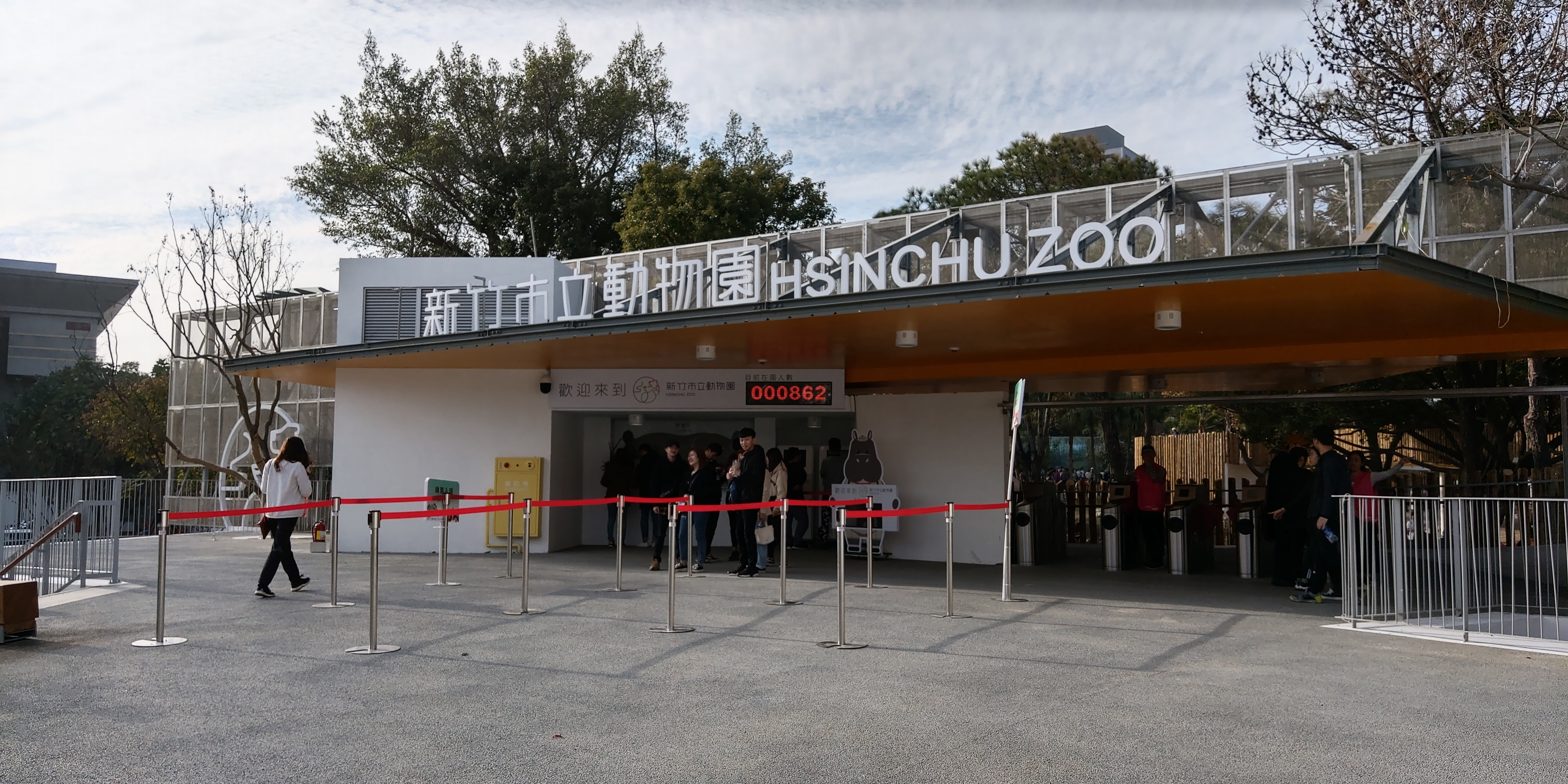
- Interactive map of Hsinchu Zoo 新竹市立動物園
- 24°48′03.8″N 120°58′46.1″E
- Date opening: 1936
- Location: East, Hsinchu City, Taiwan
- Land area: 5.4 hectares
- Website: Official website (in Chinese)

The Hsinchu Zoo (Chinese: 新竹市立動物園; pinyin: Xīnzhú Shìlì Dòngwùyuán) is a zoo in East District, Hsinchu City, Taiwan. Established in 1936, it is Taiwan's oldest zoo to continuously operate at the same location.

== History ==
Established in 1936, it is Taiwan's oldest zoo to continuously operate at the same location.

In the 1950s and 1960s, businessman Ho Kuo-hua donated a Hokkaido bear cub, an elephant, and a giraffe. Today, a memorial stands at the zoo in his honor.

=== Recent years ===
The zoo was temporarily closed for renovations in May 2017 and was reopened in December 2019. To restore the appearance of architectural features dating back to 1936, the zoo collected old photographs from the public. Architect Chiu Wen-chieh used a solvent that gradually stripped away layers of paint from statues, revealing that the base layer was green paint. Prior to closing, the zoo was home to 70 species of wild animals; this was reduced to 44 species under the rebirth project.

== Architecture ==
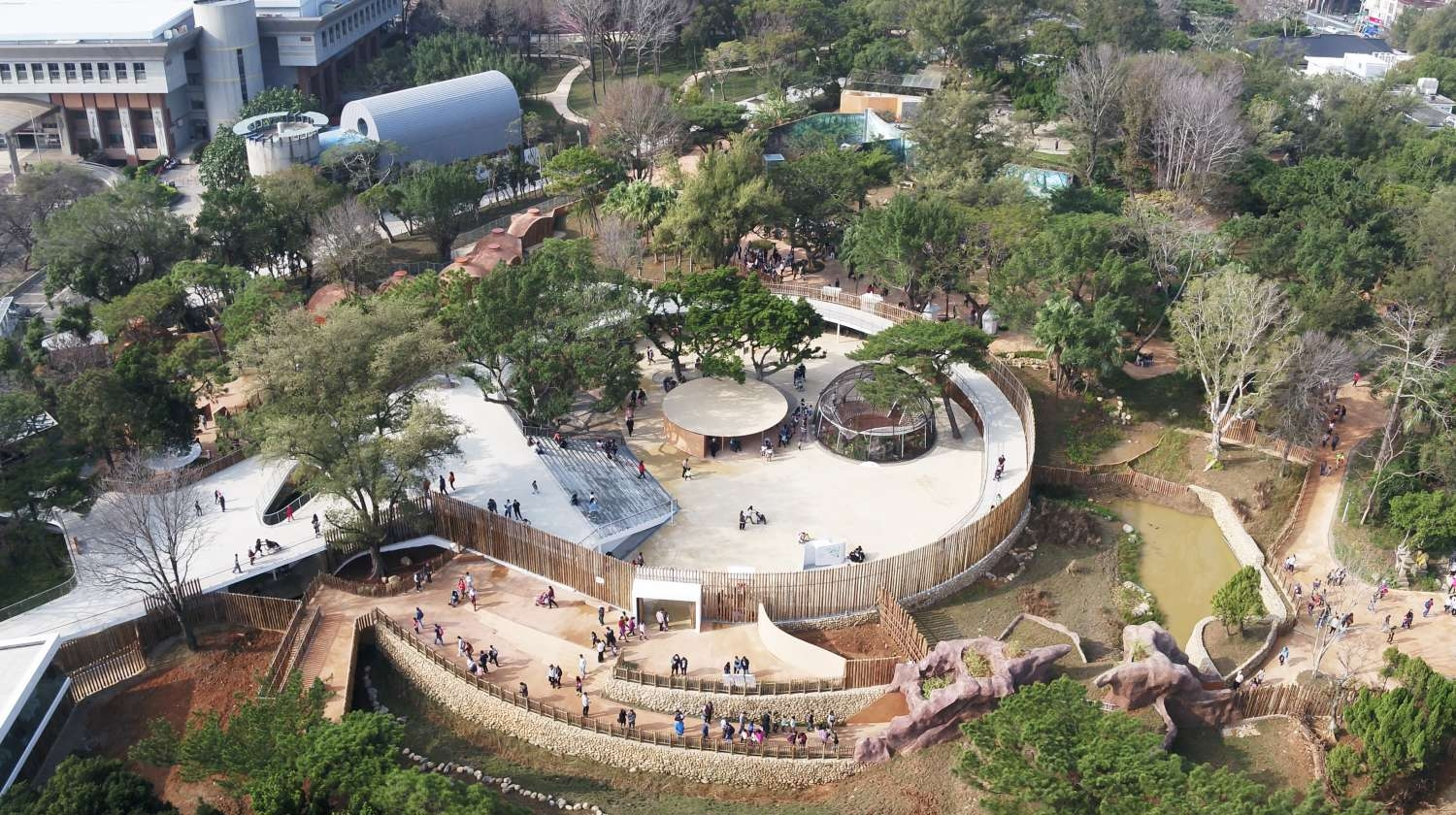
Hsinchu Zoo aerial photograph

- Children's Zoo
  - Chinchilla
  - Asian water buffalo
  - Domestic rabbit
  - Pony
- Primate's Families
  - Formosan rock monkey
  - Brown lemur
  - Grey gibbon
  - Crab eating macaque
- Bird's Paradise
  - Sulphur-crested cockatoo
  - Green peafowl
  - Common peafowl
  - Mandarin duck
- Tropical Rain Forest
  - Malayan sun bear
  - Orangutan
  - Bengal tiger
  - Alligator snapping turtle
- Reptile Kingdom
  - Yellow margined box turtle
  - African spurred tortoise
  - Green iguana
  - Red eared slider
- Deer's Wonderland
  - Formosan sika deer
  - Formosan barking deer

== Exhibitions ==
The zoo currently exhibits more than 300 animals from 100 different species, which includes 70 animals from 23 protected species.

== Transportation ==
The zoo is accessible within walking distance east of Hsinchu Station of Taiwan Railway.

== See also ==
- List of tourist attractions in Taiwan
