= National Hsinchu Living Arts Center =

Art center in East, Hsinchu City, Taiwan

- 國立新竹生活美學館
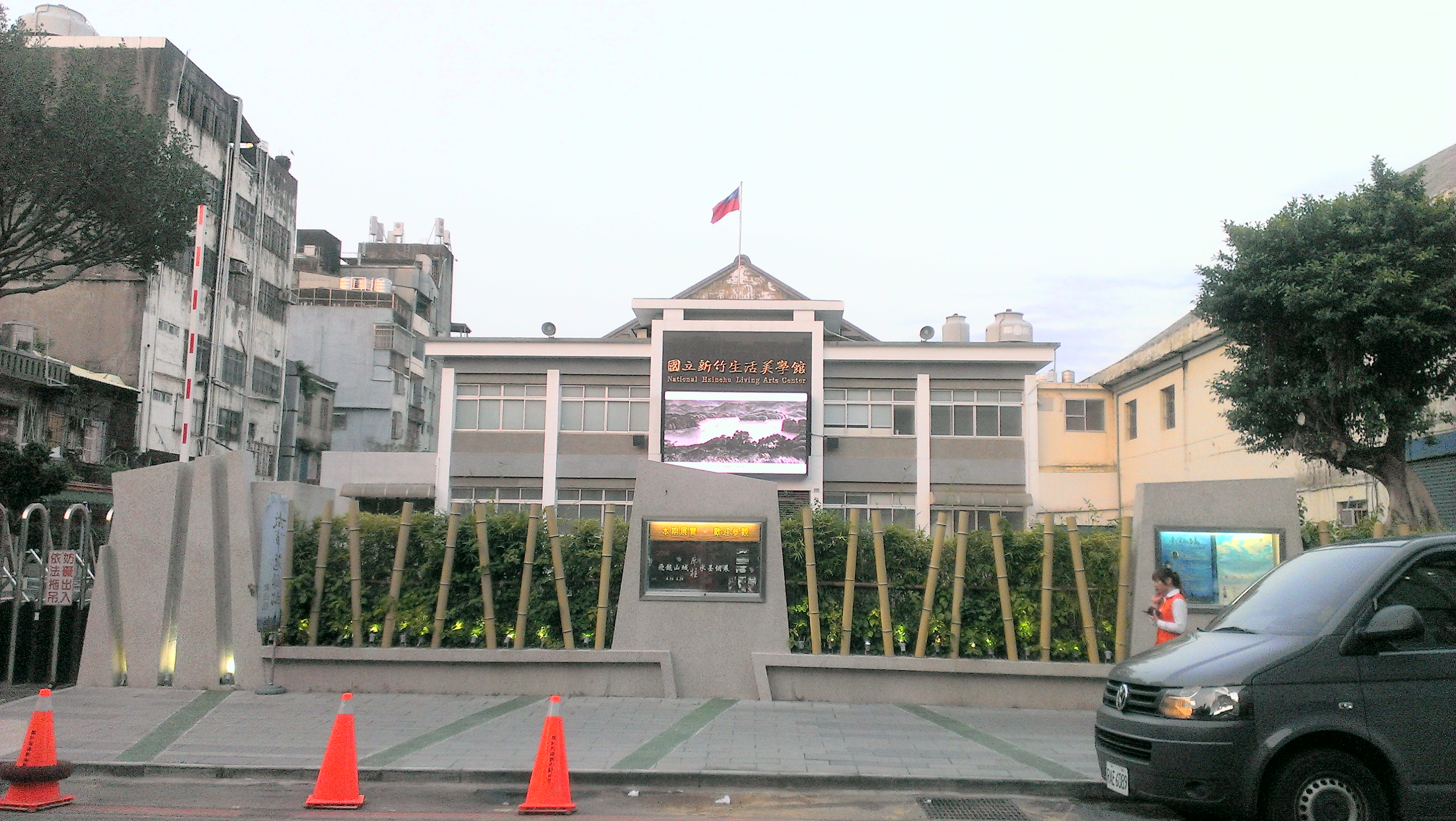
- Interactive map of National Hsinchu Living Arts Center
- Location: East, Hsinchu City, Taiwan
- Coordinates: 24°48′12.1″N 120°58′2.3″E
- Operator: 25
- Type: arts center

Construction
- Built: 1921
- Opened: 6 March 2008

Website
- Official website

The National Hsinchu Living Arts Center (NHLAC; traditional Chinese: 國立新竹生活美學館; simplified Chinese: 国立新竹生活美学馆; pinyin: Guólì Xīnzhú Shēnghuó Měixuéguǎn) is an arts center in East District, Hsinchu City, Taiwan.

== History ==
The center building was originally constructed in 1921 during the Japanese rule. The center was officially opened on 6 March 2008 to promote living arts, cultural and creative industries and community development.

== Architecture ==
The center was designed with Taiwanese and Western architectural style.

== Transportation ==
The center is accessible within walking distance northwest of Hsinchu Station of Taiwan Railway.

== See also ==
- List of tourist attractions in Taiwan
