= Yang Tzuo-chow =

Taiwanese politician (1929–2013)

Yang Tzuo-chow (Chinese: 楊作洲; 15 March 1929 – 6 May 2013) was a Taiwanese politician.

After graduating from National Taiwan University, Yang moved to Japan and pursued further study at Meiji University. While living in Japan, he served as president of a Chinese-language school in Osaka. Yang was also politically active in his native Taiwan. A member of the Kuomintang, Yang served on the party's central committee, and was appointed to the Overseas Chinese Affairs Commission before his election to the second convocation of the National Assembly on which he served as part of the presidium. Between 1999 and 2002, he represented Overseas Chinese in the Legislative Yuan on behalf of the Kuomintang. At the time of his death in Taiwan on 6 May 2013, Yang was president of a Chinese-language school in Yokohama. Yang was not fluent in Taiwanese Hokkien.
