= East District, Hsinchu =

District in Hsinchu City, Taiwan

Coordinates: 24.795929°N 120.993435°E

East 東區
- District
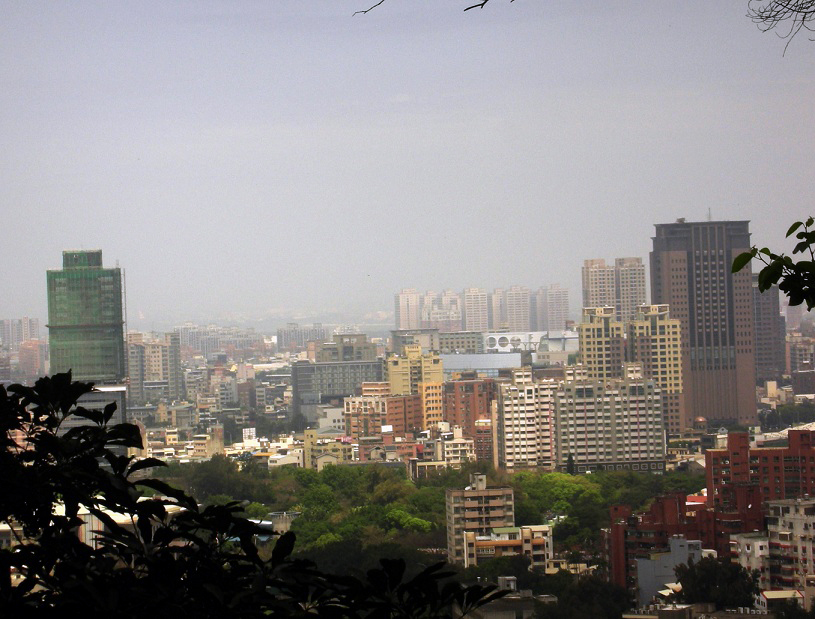

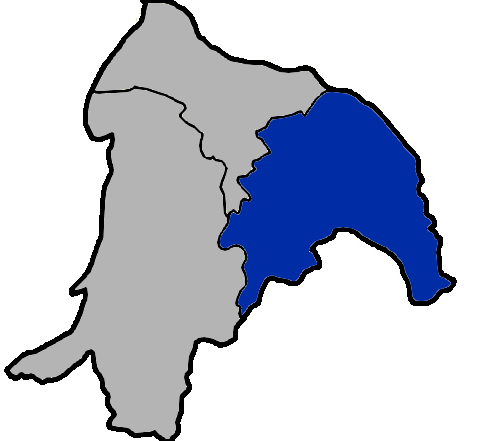
- Location: Hsinchu City, Taiwan
- Establishment: November 1990

Government
  - Type: District Government

Area
  - Total: 33.52 km^{2} (12.94 sq mi)

Population (September 2023)
  - Total: 223,061
  - Density: 6,655/km^{2} (17,240/sq mi)
- Website: dep-e-district.hccg.gov.tw/en

East District (Chinese: 東區; pinyin: Dōng Qū) is a district in east Hsinchu City, Taiwan. It is the second largest of the three districts in Hsinchu City. The East District is home to the Hsinchu Science and Industrial Park.

== Geography ==
- Area: 33.58 km^{2} (12.97 sq mi)
- Population: 223,061 (September 2023)

== Administrative divisions ==
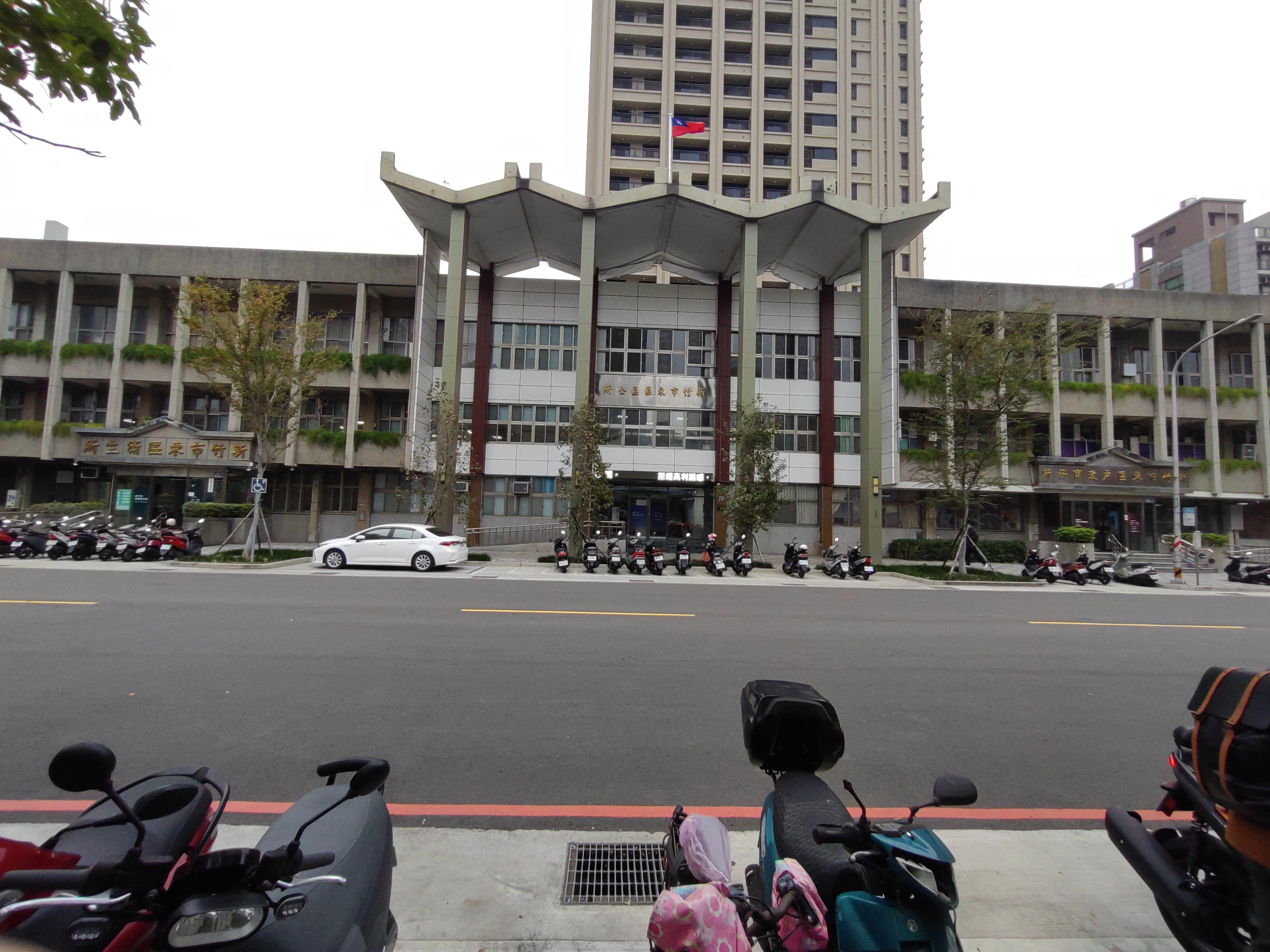
East District Office

The district consists of Nanmen, Fude, Nanshi, Guandi, Tungmen, Rongguang, Chenggong, Xiazhu, Zhulian, Siqian, Yuxian, Zhongzheng, Gongyuan, Dingzhu, Nanda, Zhenxing, Qinren, Wenhua, Fuzhong, Sanmin, Tungyuan, Tungshi, Guangfu, Fenggong, Wugong, Lushui, Tungshan, Guangzhen, Xinxing, Zhaiqiao, Gaofeng, Xiangong, Guangming, Ligong, Jungong, Jiangong, Qianxi, Shuiyuan, Qianjia, Puding, Longshan, Xinzhuang, Xianshui, Jinshan, Guantung, Keyuan, Jianhua, Xinguang, Fuxing, Jinhua, Hubin, Minghu and Guanxin Village.

== Government institutions ==
- National Synchrotron Radiation Research Center
- National Applied Research Laboratories
- Taiwan Space Agency

== Education ==
=== Universities ===
- National Yang Ming Chiao Tung University
- National Tsing Hua University

=== High schools ===
- Hsinchu American School
- Hsinchu Pei Ying Junior High School
- National Hsinchu Girls' Senior High School
- National Hsinchu Senior High School
- International Bilingual School at Hsinchu Science Park

== Tourist attractions ==
- 18 Peaks Mountain Park
- Aqueduct Museum of Hsinchu City
- Black Bat Squadron Memorial Hall
- Cheng Huang Temple
- Glass Museum of Hsinchu City
- Green Grass Lake
- Guan Di Temple
- Gu Qi Feng Cultural Museum
- Hsinchu City Art Site of Railway Warehouse
- Hsinchu Taiwan Pavilion Expo Park
- Hsinchu Zoo
- Image Museum of Hsinchu City
- Jin Shan Temple
- Jinshi Mansion
- Lake Placid
- Lee Tze-fan Memorial Art Gallery
- National Hsinchu Living Arts Center

== Transportation ==
=== Rail ===
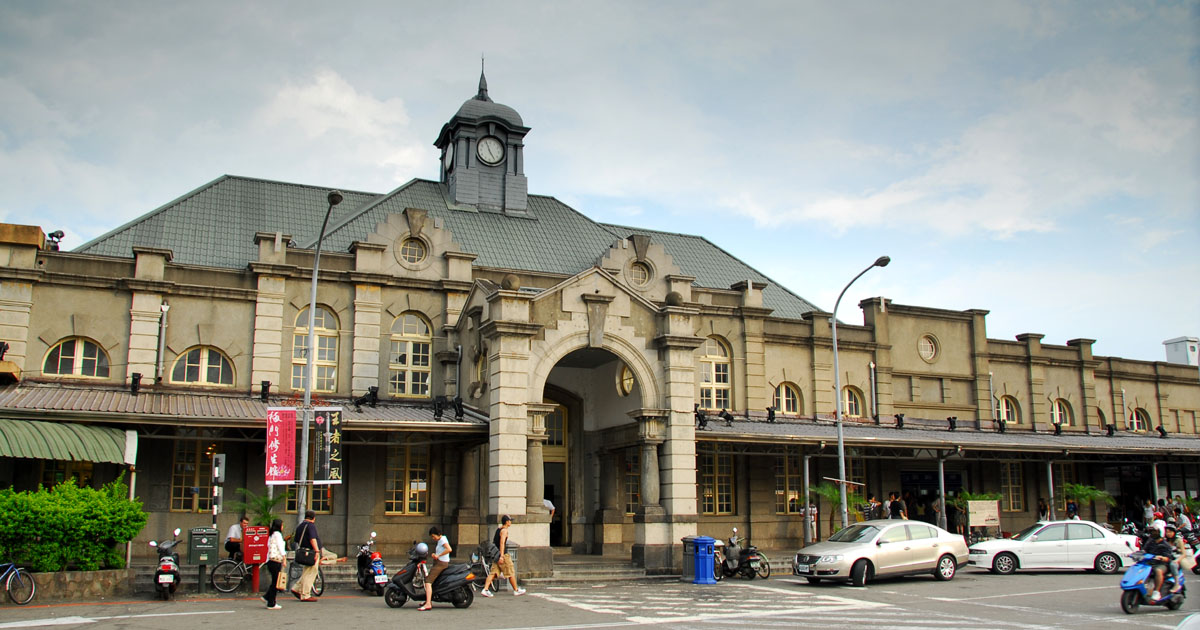
Hsinchu railway station

The Taiwan Railway serves East District via four stations: Hsinchu, North Hsinchu, Shibo and Xinzhuang. Taiwan High Speed Rail also passes through the eastern part of East District, but no station is currently planned.

=== Road ===
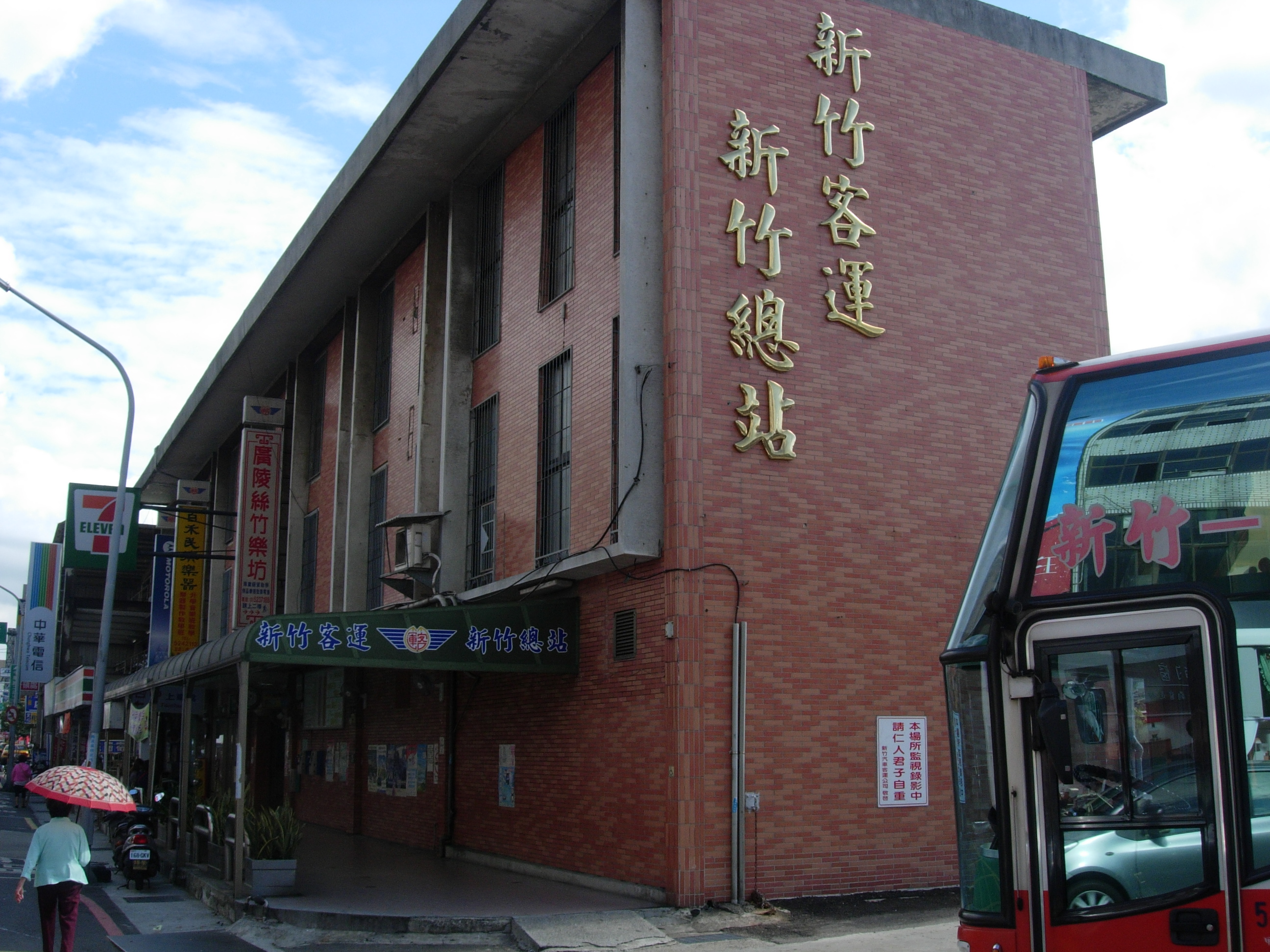
Hsinchu Bus Station

Bus station in the district is Hsinchu Bus Station of Hsinchu Bus.
