= Hsinchu =

City in northern Taiwan

Hsinchu 新竹 (Note: In local languages: Traditional Chinese script: 新竹市; Mandarin Pinyin: Xīnzhú Shì; Hokkien: Sin-tik Tshī; Sixian Hakka: Sín-zùg Sii; Hailu Hakka: Sìn-zhug Shi^{+})
- City
- Hsinchu City (新竹市)
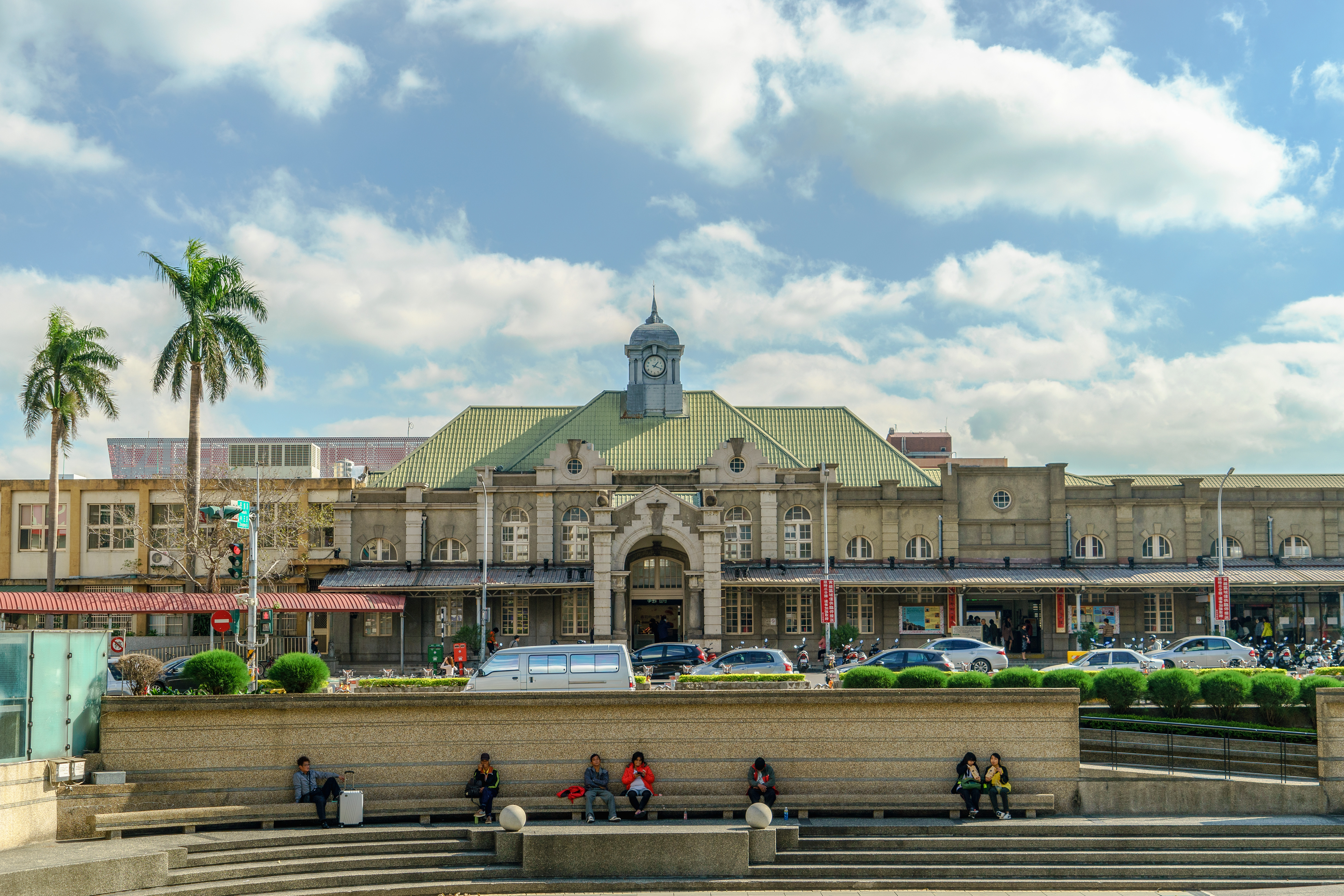
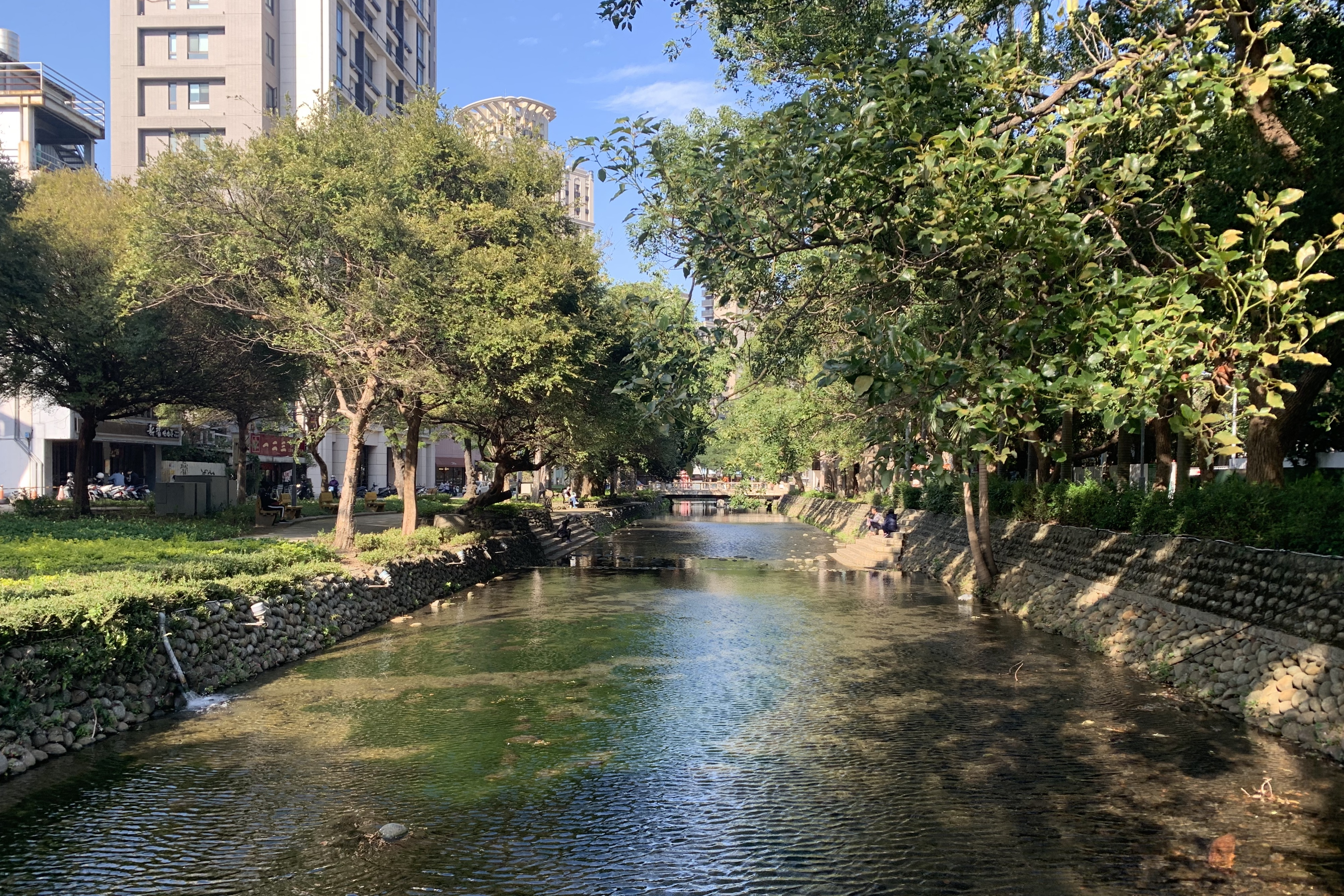
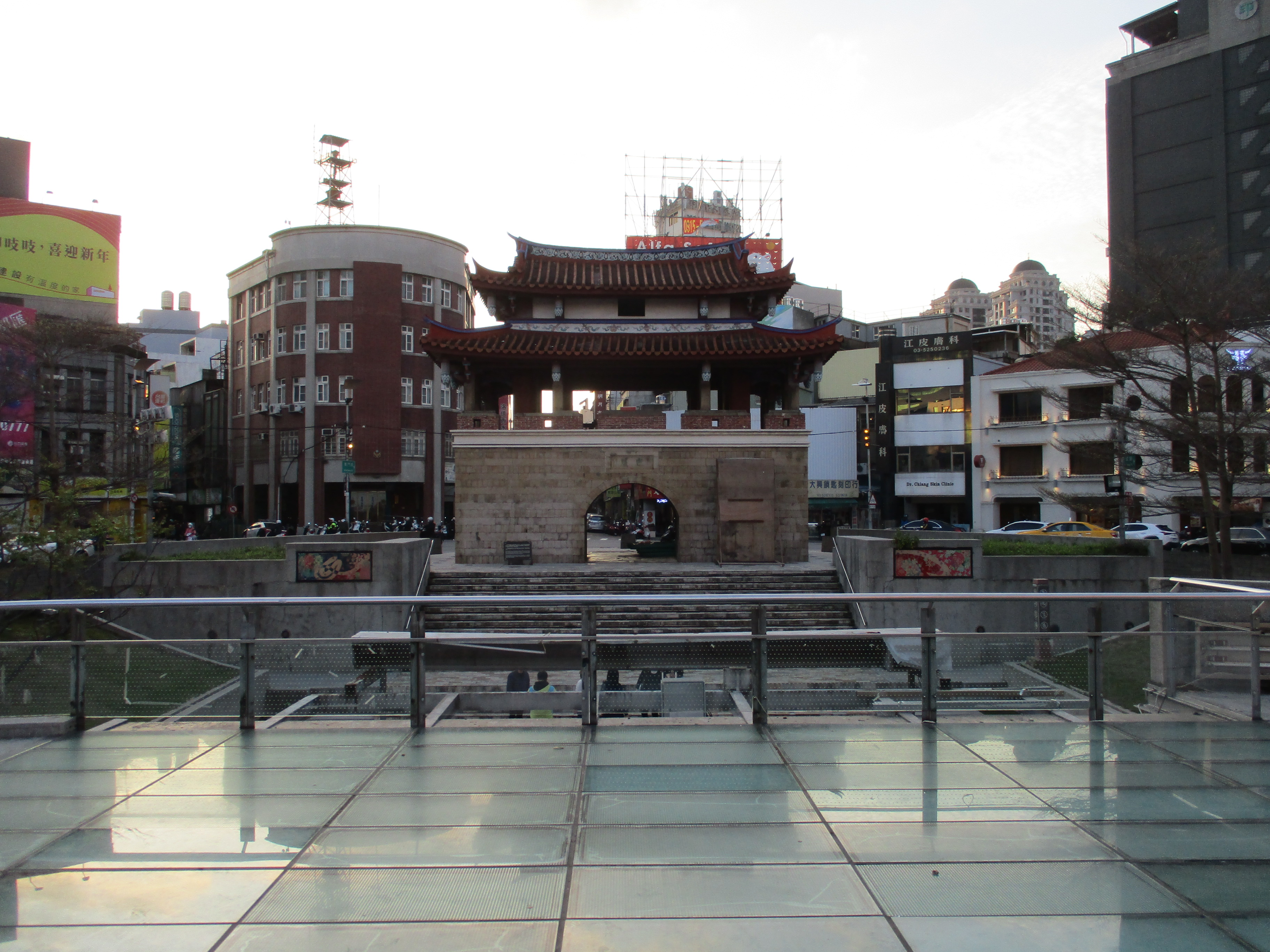
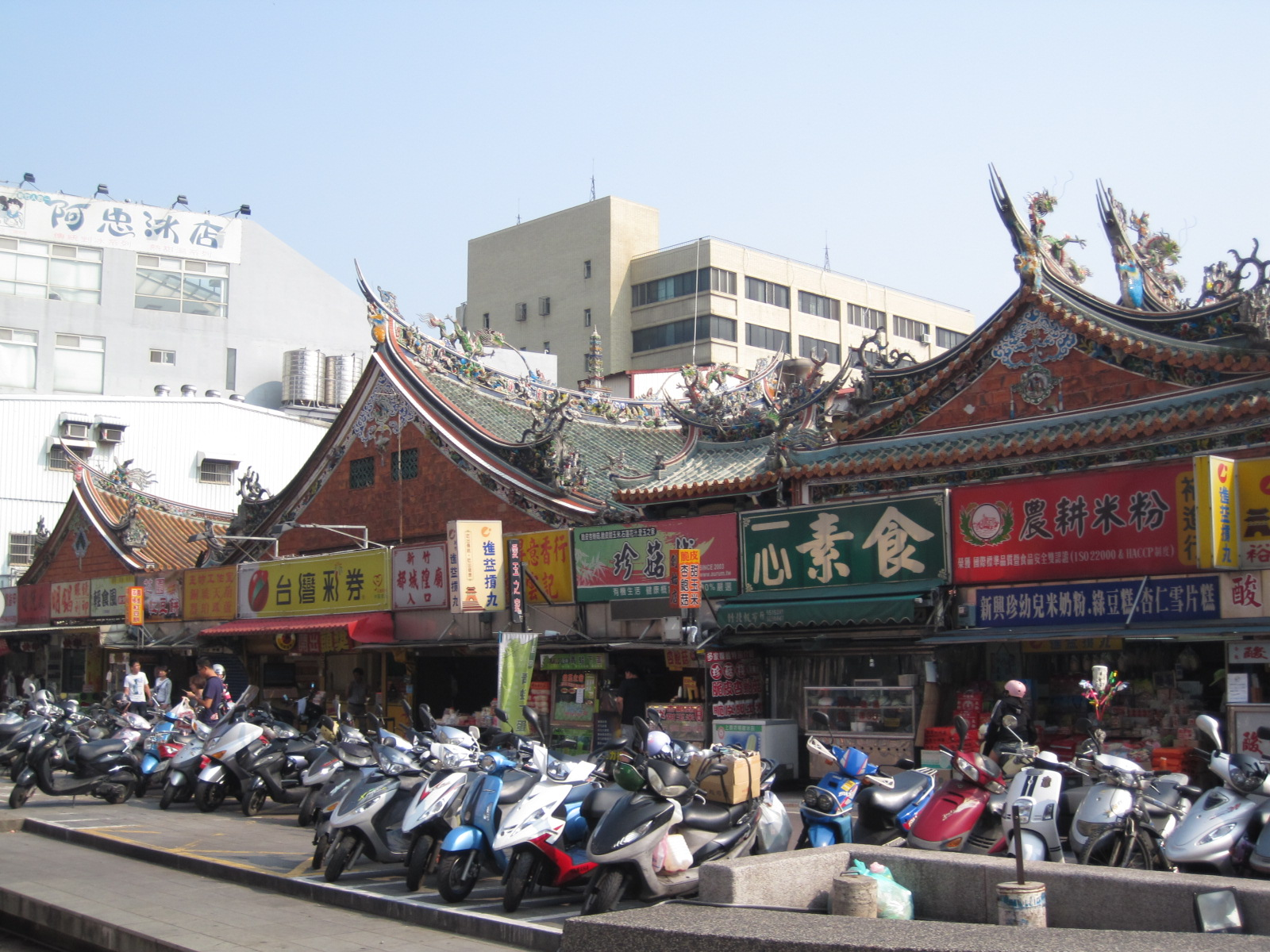
- Hsinchu Railway Station Hsinchu City Moat Park Hsinchu City East Gate Hsinchu Chenghuang Temple

- Flag Logo
- Nickname: Windy City (風城) or Chu City (竹市)

- Location within Taiwan
- Coordinates: 24°49′N 120°59′E
- Country: Republic of China (Taiwan)
- Province: Taiwan (Note: In Taiwan, provinces remain a nominal division according to the Taiwanese constitution, but are no longer considered to have any administrative function practically.)
- Region: Northern Taiwan
- First mentioned as Tek-kham: 1626
- City established: 1711
- Renamed to Hsinchu: 1878
- Part of Shinchiku Prefecture: 17 April 1895
- Reconstituted as a provincial city: 9 November 1945
- Demoted to county-administered city within Hsinchu County: 1 December 1951
- Provincial city status restored: 1 July 1982
- Seat: North District
- Districts: 3 districts: East; North; Xiangshan

Government
  - Body: Hsinchu City Government; Hsinchu City Council
  - Mayor: Ann Kao (TPP)

Area
  - Total: 104.15 km^{2} (40.21 sq mi)
  - Rank: 20 out of 22

Population (March 2025)
  - Total: 476,273
  - Rank: 15 of 22
  - Density: 4,573.0/km^{2} (11,844/sq mi)
- Time zone: UTC+8 (National Standard Time)
- Postal code: 300
- Area code: (0)3
- ISO 3166 code: TW-HSZ
- Bird: Eurasian magpie (Pica pica)
- Flower: Azalea
- Website: www.hccg.gov.tw/hccg/index

Hsinchu

Chinese name
- Chinese: 新竹
- Literal meaning: New Bamboo
Transcriptions
Standard Mandarin
- Hanyu Pinyin: Xīnzhú
- Bopomofo: ㄒㄧㄣ ㄓㄨˊ
- Gwoyeu Romatzyh: Shinjwu
- Wade–Giles: Hsin^{1}-chu^{2}
- Tongyong Pinyin: Sinjhú
- Yale Romanization: Syīnjú
- MPS2: Shīnjú
- IPA: [ɕín.ʈʂǔ]
Hakka
- Pha̍k-fa-sṳ: Sîn-chuk
Southern Min
- Hokkien POJ: Sin-tek
- Tâi-lô: Sin-tik

Japanese name
- Kanji: 新竹
- Hiragana: しんちく
- Katakana: シンチク
Transcriptions
- Revised Hepburn: Shinchiku
- Kunrei-shiki: Sintiku

Former names

Zhuqian
- Traditional Chinese: 竹塹
- Literal meaning: Bamboo natural barrier
Transcriptions
Standard Mandarin
- Hanyu Pinyin: Zhúqiàn
- Bopomofo: ㄓㄨˊ ㄑㄧㄢˋ
- Wade–Giles: Chu^{2}-ch‘ien^{4}
- Tongyong Pinyin: Jhúciàn
- IPA: [ʈʂǔ.tɕʰjɛ̂n]
Southern Min
- Hokkien POJ: Tek-khàm

Nicknames

Windy City
- Traditional Chinese: 風城
Transcriptions
Standard Mandarin
- Hanyu Pinyin: Fēngchéng
- Bopomofo: ㄈㄥ ㄔㄥˊ
- Gwoyeu Romatzyh: Fengcherng
- Wade–Giles: Feng^{1}-chʻeng^{2}
- Tongyong Pinyin: Fongchéng
- Yale Romanization: Fēngchéng
- MPS2: Fēngchéng
- IPA: [fə́ŋ.ʈʂʰə̌ŋ]

Hsinchu (Chinese: 新竹; pinyin: Xīnzhú, IPA: [ɕin˥ʈʂu˧˥]), officially Hsinchu City, is a city located in northwestern Taiwan. It is the most populous city in Taiwan that is not a special municipality, with estimated 476,273 inhabitants. Hsinchu is a coastal city bordering the Taiwan Strait to the west, Hsinchu County to the north and east, and Miaoli County to the south. Hsinchu is nicknamed the Windy City for its strong northeastern monsoon during the autumn and winter seasons.

The area was originally settled by the Austronesian Taiwanese indigenous peoples, with the settlement being named Tek-kham by Hokkien and Hakka immigrants. The city was founded by Han Chinese colonists in 1711, and renamed "Hsinchu" in 1878. During Japanese rule, the city was named "Shinchiku" and was the seat of Shinchiku Prefecture. The prefecture encompassed present-day Hsinchu City and County, as well as entire Taoyuan and Miaoli. After the ROC rule in 1945, the urban area of Hsinchu was organized as a provincial city.

In 1980, the Taiwanese government established the Hsinchu Science Park, an industrial centre for semiconductor manufacturing. The headquarters of TSMC, a semiconductor foundry, MediaTek and United Microelectronics Corporation, are all located in the park.

Besides its industry, Hsinchu is a cultural center of Taiwan. The Chenghuang Temple of Hsinchu, built in 1747, is a common prayer destination. The research institutions of National Yang Ming Chiao Tung University and National Tsing Hua University are both located near the science park.

== Etymology ==
Hsin-chu is the Wade-Giles romanization of the Mandarin pronunciation of the Chinese name 新竹. The same name is rendered Xīnzhú in Hanyu Pinyin and Sinjhú in Tongyong Pinyin.

This name refers to the settlement's original Hokkien name Tek-chhàm (竹塹), meaning "bamboo barrier". The name may transcribe an aboriginal name meaning "Seashore". The same name is variously recorded as Teukcham, Teuxham, Tekcham, and Teckcham; its Mandarin pronunciation appears as Chuchien.

Hsinchu is popularly nicknamed "The Windy City" for its windy climate and "The Garden City of Culture and Technology" by its tourism department.

== History ==
=== Early settlement ===
The area around Hsinchu City was inhabited by the Taokas aborigines when the Spanish immigrants occupied northern Taiwan in the 17th century. Catholic missionaries reached the settlement of Tek-kham in 1626. The Spanish were expelled by the Dutch immigrants a few decades later.

A Chinese town was established at Tek-kham by Wang Shih-chieh and other Han settlers in 1711. Wang and his party of over 180 people were natives of Kinmen who first camped alongside what is now Dongqian Street in East District, Hsinchu.

As part of the reorganization of Taiwan by Shen Baozhen, the viceroy of Liangjiang, Zhuqian Subprefecture (i.e., Tek-kham) was raised to the level of a county and renamed Xinzhu (i.e., Sin-tek or Hsinchu) in 1878. When Taiwan was made a province in 1887, Hsinchu was made a part of Taipeh Prefecture.

=== Japanese occupation ===
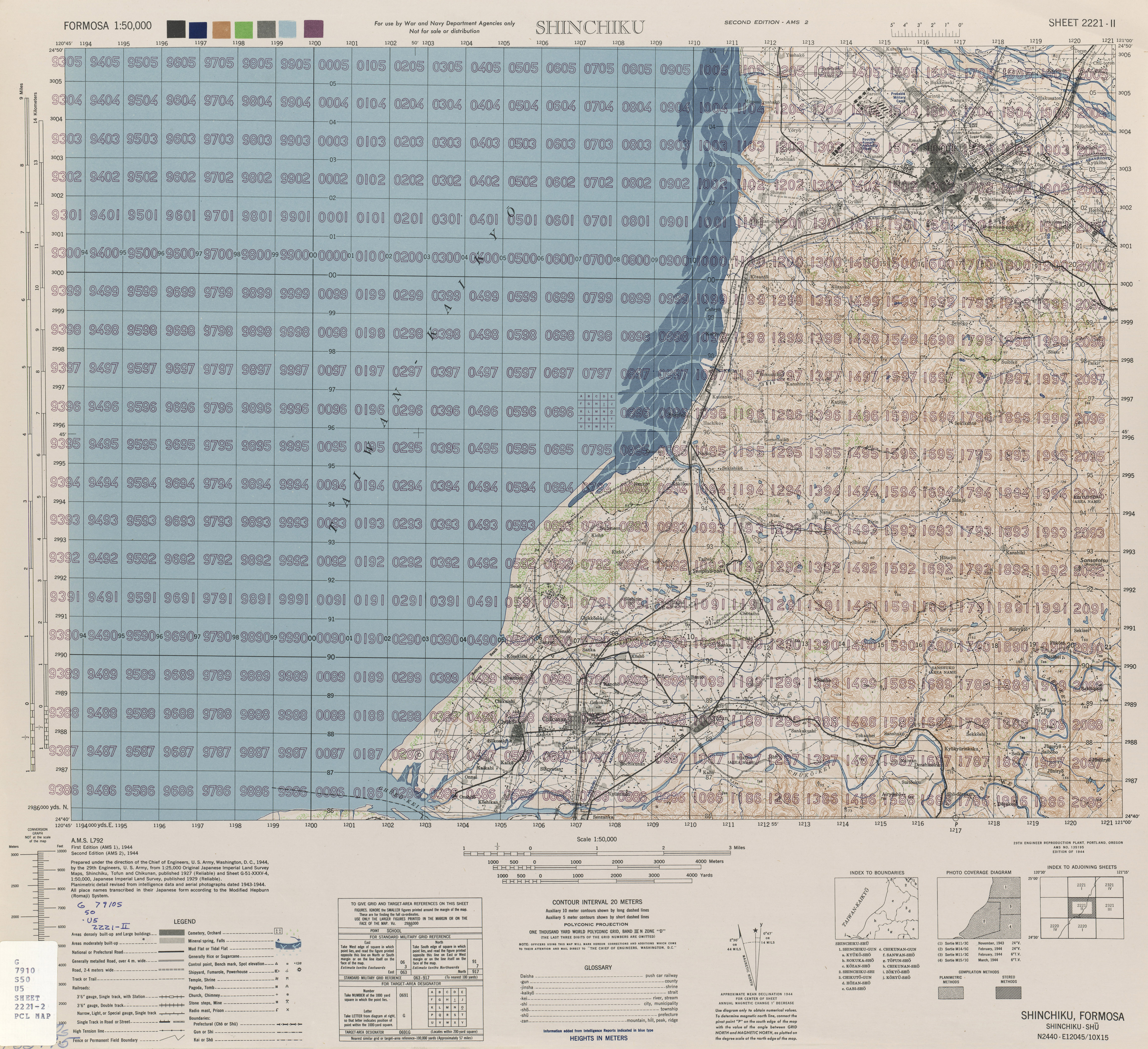
Map of Hsinchu (labeled as SHINCHIKU) and surrounding area (1944)

During the Japanese occupation, the city—known at the time as Shinchiku—was among the province's most populous. In 1904, its 16,371 residents ranked it in 7th place, behind Keelung and ahead of Changhua ("Shoka"). Shinchiku was raised to town status in 1920 and city status in 1930. At the same time, it became the seat of Shinchiku Prefecture. In 1941, its prefecture was expanded, annexing Xiangshan ("Kōzan"). Jiugang ("Kyūminato") and Liujia ("Rokka") merged to become Zhubei ("Chikuhoku").

=== Republic of China rule ===
The Republic of China's Kuomintang government of the established the Hsinchu City Government in 1945 to oversee all of what had been Shinchiku Prefecture under the Japanese.

In 1946, the Take-Over Committee dissolved and replaced by the Hsinchu County Government, located in Taoyuan. As the administrative districts were readjusted, Hsinchu was granted provincial city status. It used the old prefecture office as its city hall at 120 Chung Cheng Road. In February 1946, representative congresses were formed for seven district offices. On 15 April, the city congress was formed. Provincial representatives were elected from among the city legislators.

On 16 August 1950, the administrative districts on Taiwan were re-adjusted once more, demarcating 16 counties and 5 provincial cities.

In June 1982, under presidential order, the Xiangshan Township of Hsinchu County merged into Hsinchu City. A new municipal government was formally established on 1 July 1982, comprising 103 villages and 1,635 neighborhoods. These were organized into the East, North, and Xiangshan districts by 1 November. By June 1983, the new government consisted of three bureaus (Civil Service, Public Works, and Education), four departments (Finance, Social Welfare, Compulsory Military Service, and Land Affairs), four offices (Secretary, Planning, Personnel, and Auditing), and 49 various sections. The Police Department, Tax Department, and Medicine and Hygiene Department were considered affiliate institutions.

From 1994 to 1999, as Taiwan made its transition from authoritarian rule to a representative democracy and the mostly pro forma provincial level of government began to be dissolved, regulations were established for the self-government of Hsinchu. A deputy mayor, consumer officer, and three consultants were added to the city government. In 2002, the city added a Bureau of Labor and transferred Compulsory Military Service to the Department of Civil Service.

A movement is underway from 2021 to have Hsinchu City and Hsinchu County to be upgraded to the nation's seventh special municipality.

== Geography ==
The city is bordered by Hsinchu County to the north and east, Miaoli County to the south, and the Taiwan Strait to the west.

=== Climate ===
Hsinchu's climate is humid subtropical (Koppen: Cfa). The city is located in a part of the island that has a rainy season that lasts from February to September, with the heaviest time coming late April through August during the southwest monsoon, and also experiences heavy "plum rains" in May and early June. The city succumbs to hot humid weather from June until September, while October to December are arguably the most pleasant times of year. Hsinchu is affected by easterly winds off of the East China Sea. Natural hazards such as typhoons and earthquakes are common in the region.

Climate data for Hsinchu City (1991–2020 normals, extremes 1938–present）
| Month | Jan | Feb | Mar | Apr | May | Jun | Jul | Aug | Sep | Oct | Nov | Dec | Year |
|---|---|---|---|---|---|---|---|---|---|---|---|---|---|
| Record high °C (°F) | 30.3 (86.5) | 30.6 (87.1) | 33.8 (92.8) | 34.1 (93.4) | 35.5 (95.9) | 37.4 (99.3) | 38.0 (100.4) | 39.4 (102.9) | 38.8 (101.8) | 37.9 (100.2) | 34.4 (93.9) | 31.1 (88.0) | 39.4 (102.9) |
| Mean daily maximum °C (°F) | 19.1 (66.4) | 19.4 (66.9) | 21.6 (70.9) | 25.6 (78.1) | 28.9 (84.0) | 31.5 (88.7) | 33.2 (91.8) | 32.8 (91.0) | 31.2 (88.2) | 28.0 (82.4) | 25.1 (77.2) | 21.1 (70.0) | 26.5 (79.6) |
| Daily mean °C (°F) | 15.7 (60.3) | 16.0 (60.8) | 18.0 (64.4) | 21.9 (71.4) | 25.2 (77.4) | 27.9 (82.2) | 29.3 (84.7) | 28.9 (84.0) | 27.3 (81.1) | 24.4 (75.9) | 21.5 (70.7) | 17.7 (63.9) | 22.8 (73.1) |
| Mean daily minimum °C (°F) | 13.1 (55.6) | 13.4 (56.1) | 15.2 (59.4) | 18.9 (66.0) | 22.2 (72.0) | 24.9 (76.8) | 26.0 (78.8) | 25.8 (78.4) | 24.4 (75.9) | 21.8 (71.2) | 18.8 (65.8) | 15.1 (59.2) | 20 (68) |
| Record low °C (°F) | −0.1 (31.8) | 3.5 (38.3) | 3.4 (38.1) | 4.9 (40.8) | 11.7 (53.1) | 14.7 (58.5) | 20.2 (68.4) | 18.9 (66.0) | 14.7 (58.5) | 9.5 (49.1) | 6.6 (43.9) | 4.0 (39.2) | −0.1 (31.8) |
| Average precipitation mm (inches) | 75.7 (2.98) | 123.0 (4.84) | 159.8 (6.29) | 161.9 (6.37) | 249.0 (9.80) | 252.0 (9.92) | 120.2 (4.73) | 197.1 (7.76) | 174.5 (6.87) | 53.6 (2.11) | 51.1 (2.01) | 57.7 (2.27) | 1,675.6 (65.95) |
| Average precipitation days (≥ 0.1 mm) | 9.8 | 11.3 | 13.5 | 12.7 | 12.0 | 10.6 | 7.9 | 10.7 | 8.9 | 5.5 | 6.8 | 8.0 | 117.7 |
| Average relative humidity (%) | 78.3 | 80.4 | 79.6 | 78.4 | 78.1 | 77.0 | 74.3 | 75.9 | 74.5 | 73.8 | 75.5 | 76.3 | 76.8 |
| Mean monthly sunshine hours | 106.7 | 91.0 | 101.0 | 111.6 | 145.4 | 185.0 | 240.6 | 209.7 | 193.5 | 190.0 | 144.8 | 126.1 | 1,845.4 |
Source: Central Weather Bureau

=== Demographics ===
Populations by city and country in Taiwan
| Year | Pop. | ±% |
|---|---|---|
| 1985 | 304,010 | — |
| 1990 | 324,426 | +6.7% |
| 1995 | 340,255 | +4.9% |
| 2000 | 368,439 | +8.3% |
| 2005 | 394,757 | +7.1% |
| 2010 | 415,344 | +5.2% |
| 2015 | 434,060 | +4.5% |
| 2020 | 451,412 | +4.0% |
| 2025 | 455,740 | +1.0% |
Source: "Populations by city and country in Taiwan". Ministry of the Interior. May 2018.

View source data.

== Government ==
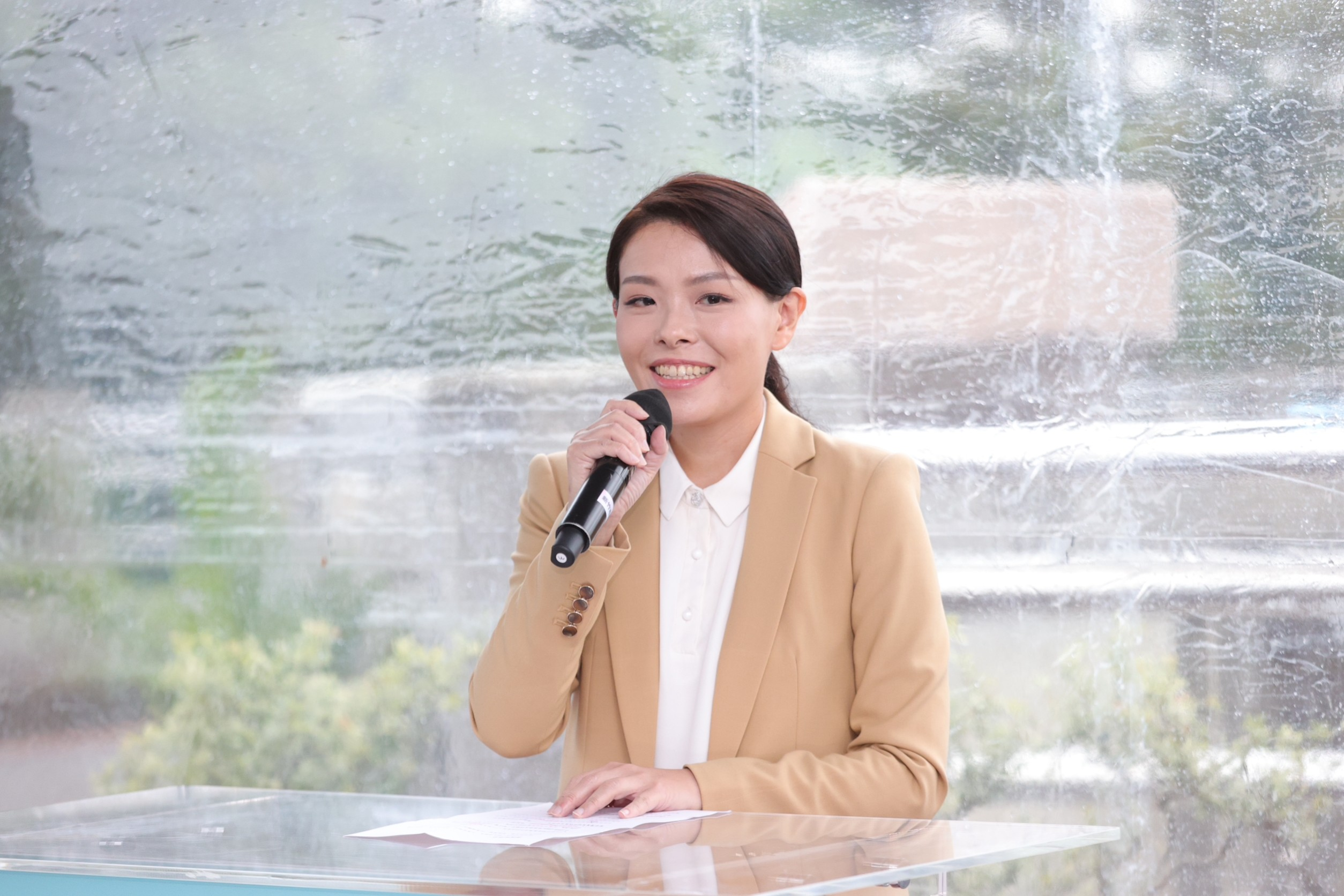
Hsinchu mayor Gao.

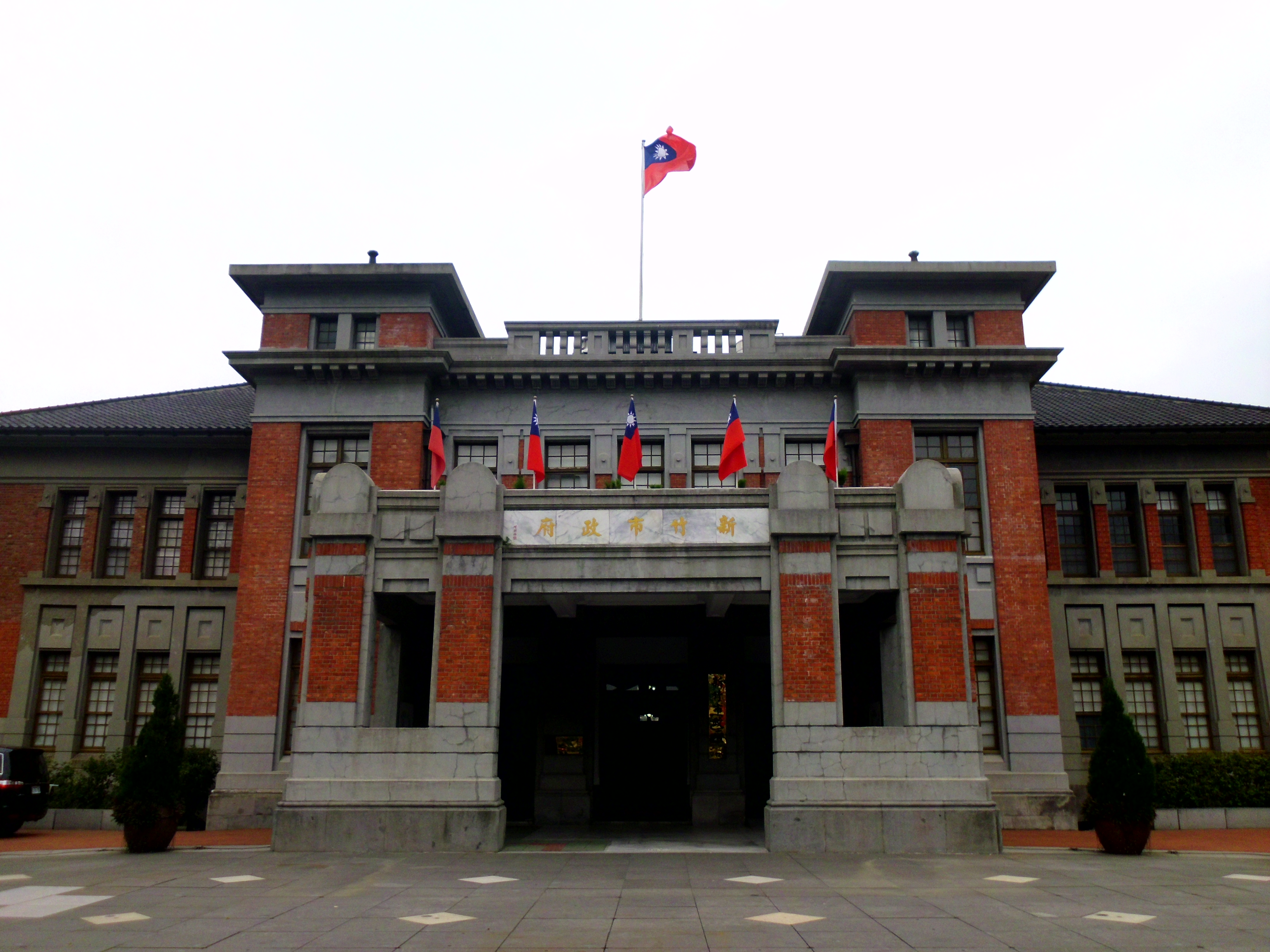
Hsinchu City Government

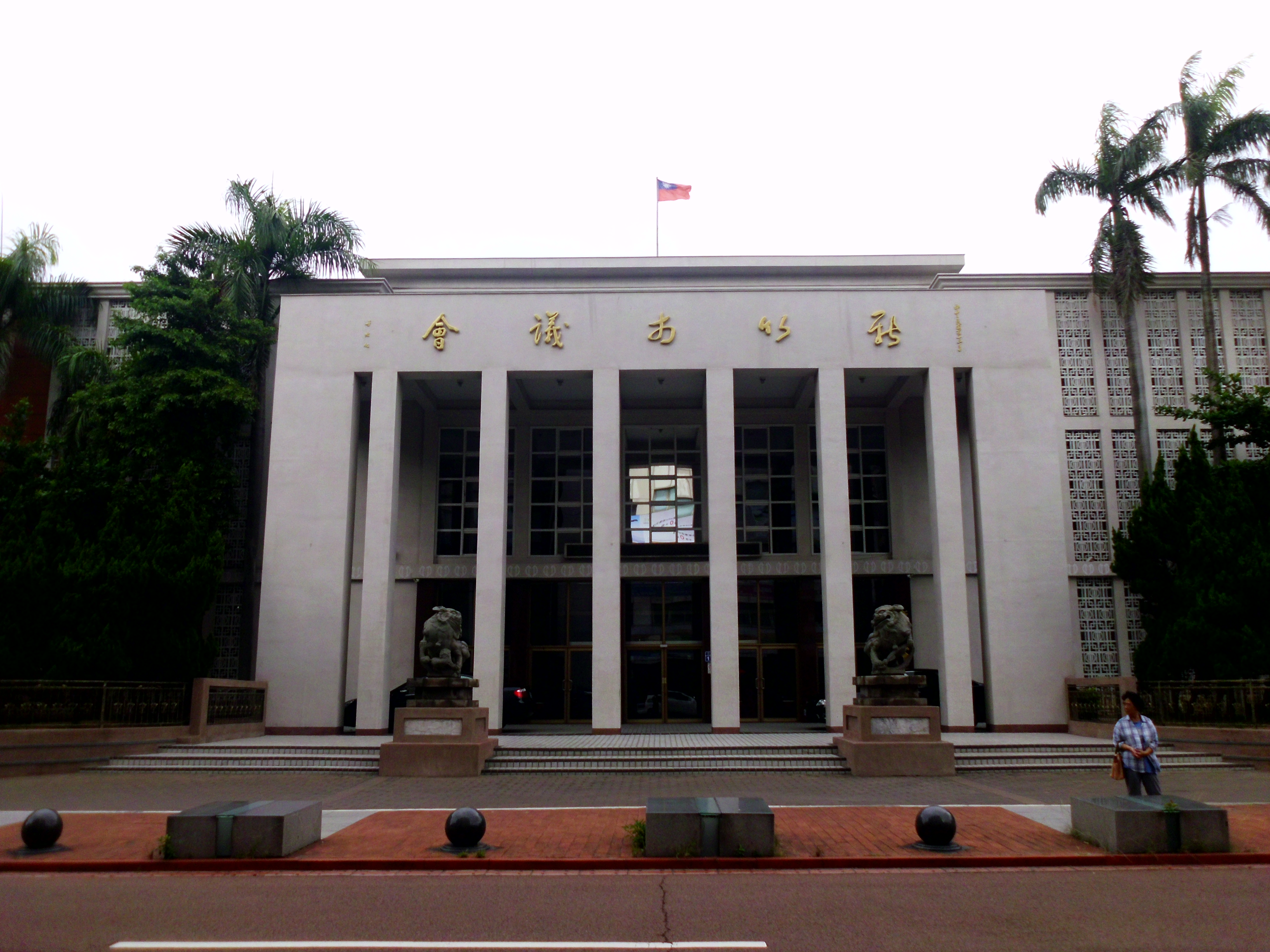
Hsinchu City Council

Hsinchu City is administered as a city. North District is the seat of Hsinchu City which houses the Hsinchu City Government and Hsinchu City Council. The incumbent acting Mayor is Andy Chiu of the Taiwan People's Party.

=== Administrative divisions ===
Hsinchu has 3 districts (區):

| Map | Name | Chinese | Hokkien | Hakka | Population (March 2023) | Area (km²) |
|---|---|---|---|---|---|---|
| | East | 東區 | Tang | Tûng | 222,223 | 33.5768 |
| | North | 北區 | Pak | Pet | 152,504 | 15.7267 |
| | Xiangshan | 香山區 | Hiong-san | Hiông-sân | 78,809 | 54.8491 |

Colors indicate the common language status of Hakka within each division.

=== Politics ===
The city was historically pan-Blue but in recent years, the pan-Green coalition has started to rise in popularity. As a result, local factions have decreased in power, and political parties have greater importance in local elections.

Hsinchu City elected a Kuomintang legislator, Cheng Cheng-chien, as its representative in the Legislative Yuan during the 2020 Taiwan general election, flipping the seat from the Democratic Progressive Party. Cheng won reelection in the 2024 election.

In July 2024, then-Mayor Ann Kao was suspended from her duties and sentenced to prison for violating the Anti-Corruption Act and the Criminal Code. Deputy Mayor Andy Chiu subsequently assumed the duties of Mayor.

== Economy ==
Natives of Hui'an County, Fujian, settled in Hsinchu during the Qing dynasty and adapted their rice noodle-making techniques to Hsinchu's climate. Hsinchu remained a center of traditional rice noodle manufacturing throughout the 1960s, until the industry declined the following decade.

The Hsinchu Science Park has around 360 companies. The purpose of the park is to attract high-tech investment to Taiwan. Since its establishment in 1978, the government has invested over NT$30 billion in software and hardware ventures. In 2001, it developed 2.5 km^{2} (0.97 sq mi) of land in the park and 0.5 km^{2} (0.19 sq mi) in southern Hsinchu.

The semiconductor and related electronic businesses have faced competition from South Korea and the United States. This has resulted in lower profits and an oversupply of some electronic products, such as memory and semiconductors.

In 2020, Hsinchu was classified as a "Sufficiency" level global city by the Globalization and World Cities Research Network.

== Education ==
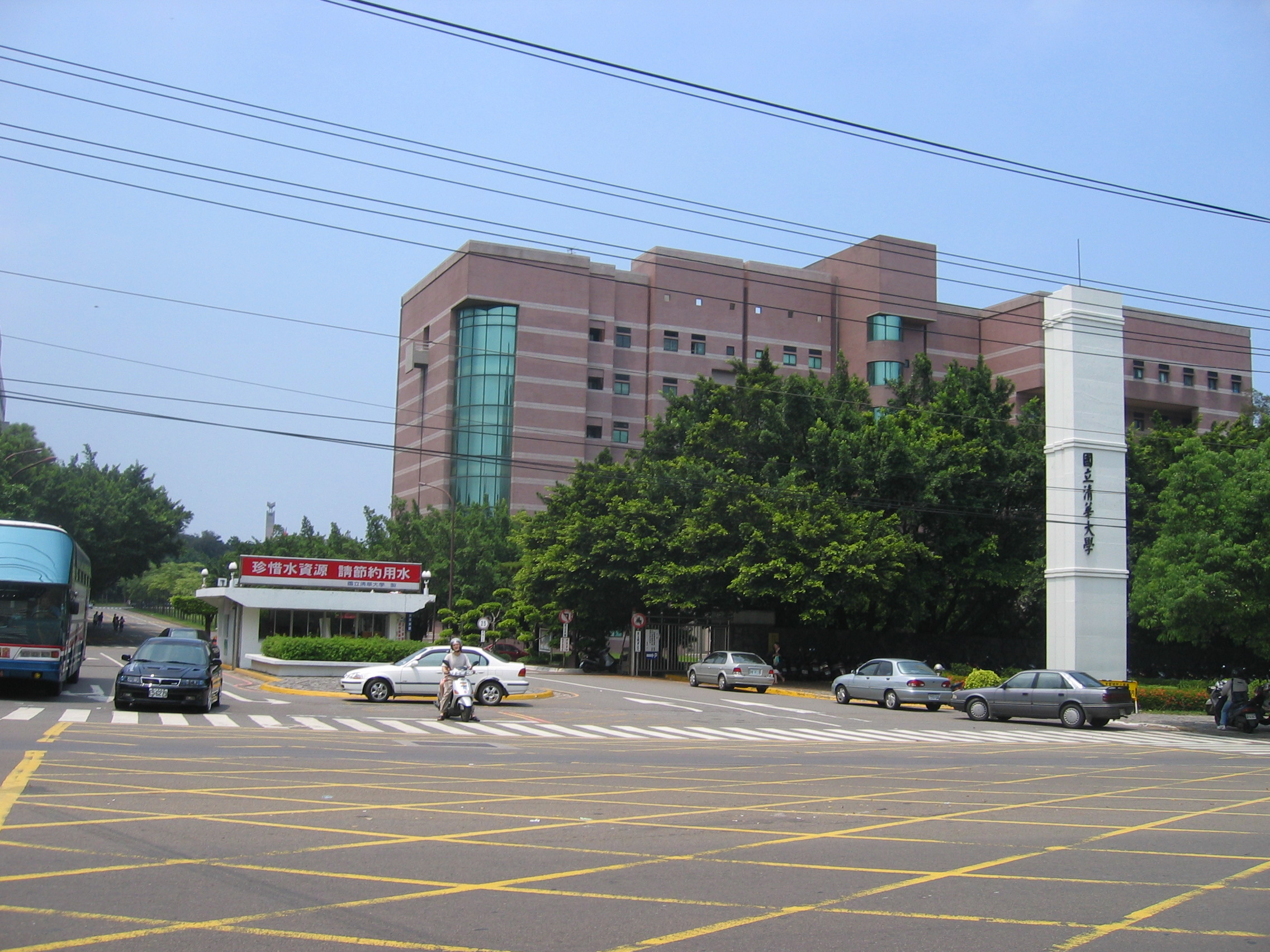
National Tsing Hua University

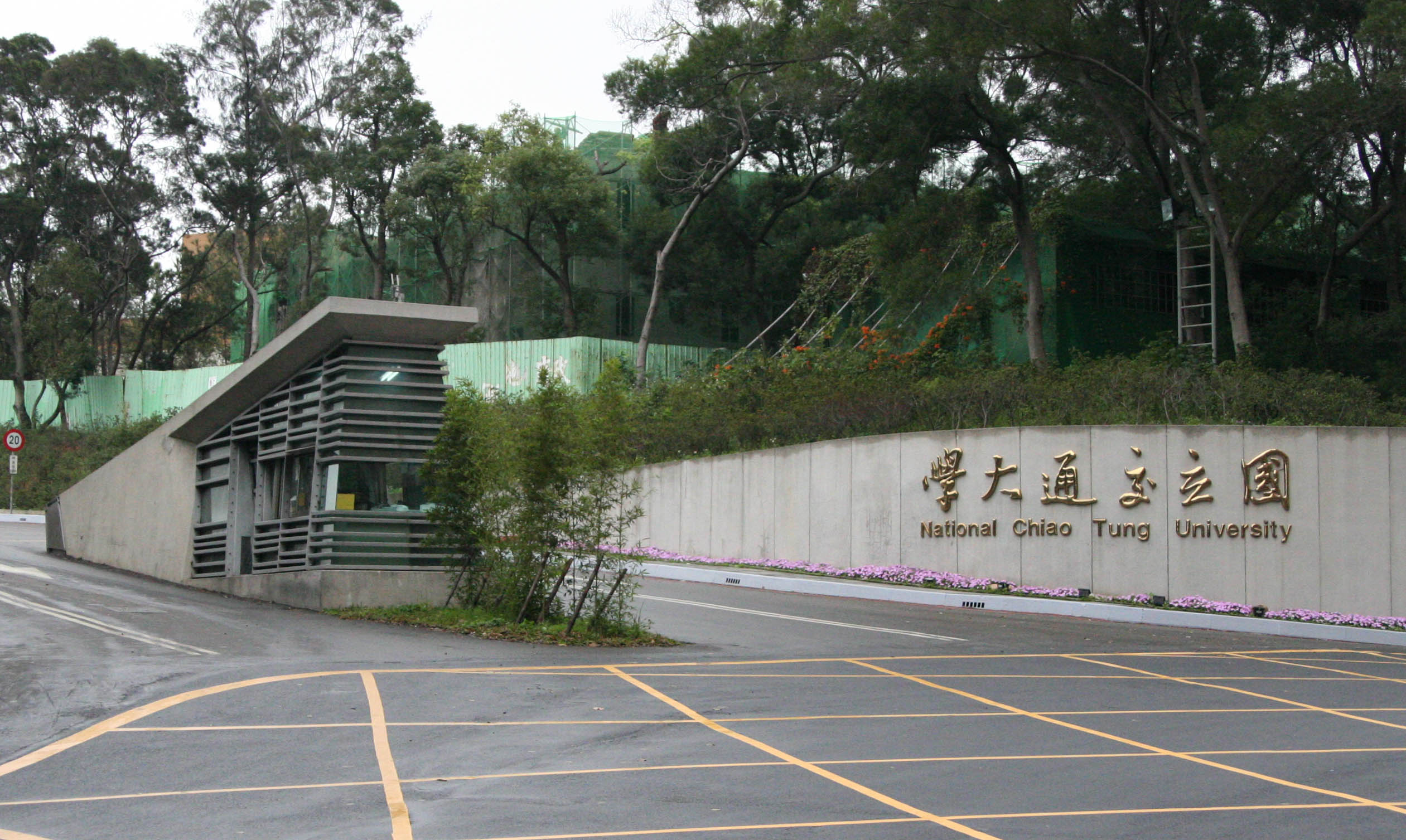
National Yang Ming Chiao Tung University

Hsinchu City is one of the most focused educational centers in northern Taiwan. It has six universities in this concentrated area, and among these universities, National Yang Ming Chiao Tung University and National Tsing Hua University are focused on by the government of Taiwan. Other public and private educational institutions in the city included 33 elementary schools, 19 middle schools, 12 high schools and a complete secondary school.

International schools (grade school and secondary school)

- Pacific American School
- Hsinchu International School
- Hsinchu American School

High Schools

- National Experimental High School
- National Hsinchu Senior High School
- National Hsinchu Girls' Senior High School
- Hsinchu Kuang-Fu Senior High School

Universities

- National Yang Ming Chiao Tung University
- National Tsing Hua University
- Chung Hua University
- Hsuan Chuang University
- Yuanpei University of Medical Technology
- National Hsinchu University of Education

== Tourist attractions ==
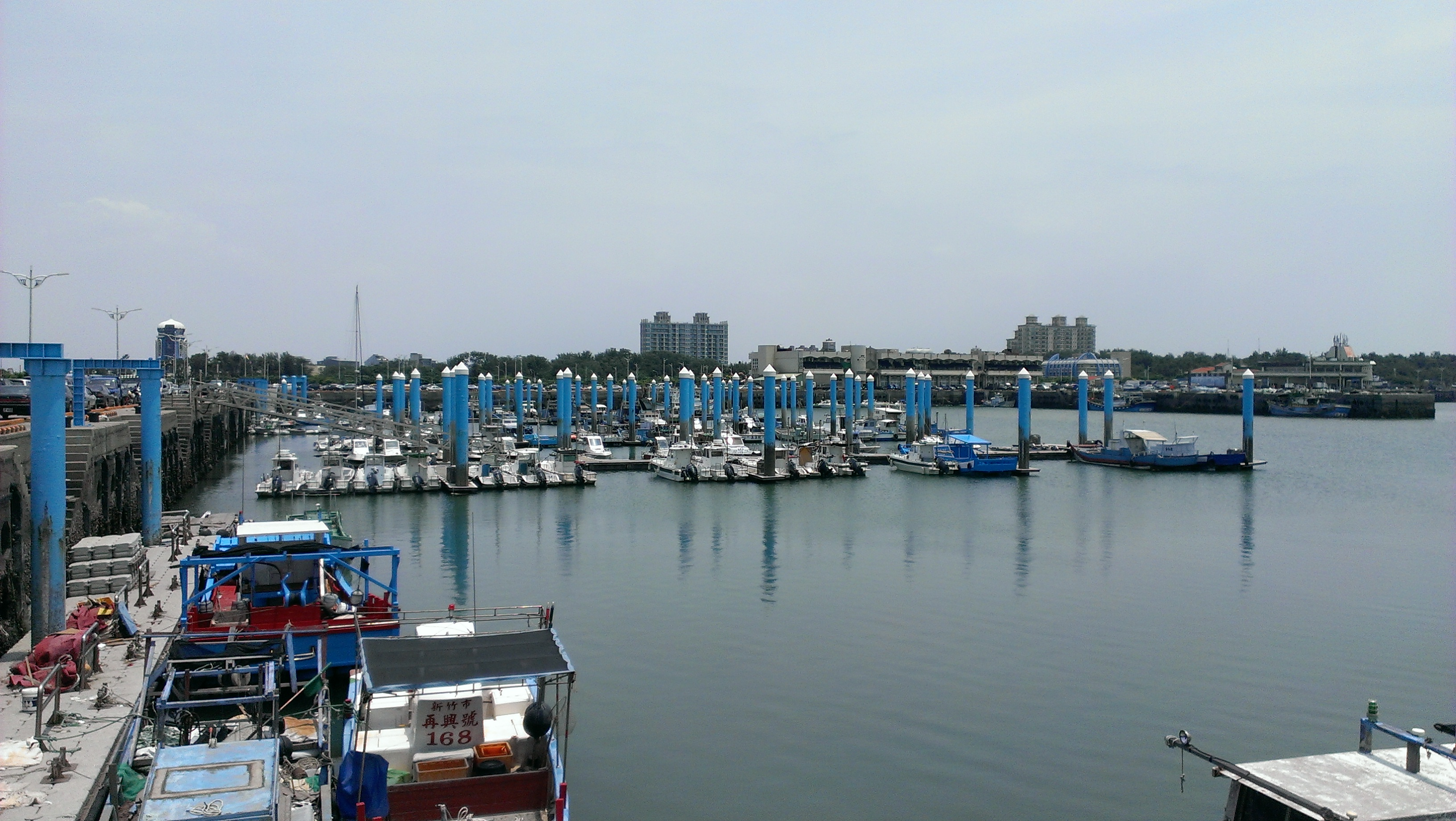
Hsinchu Fish Harbor

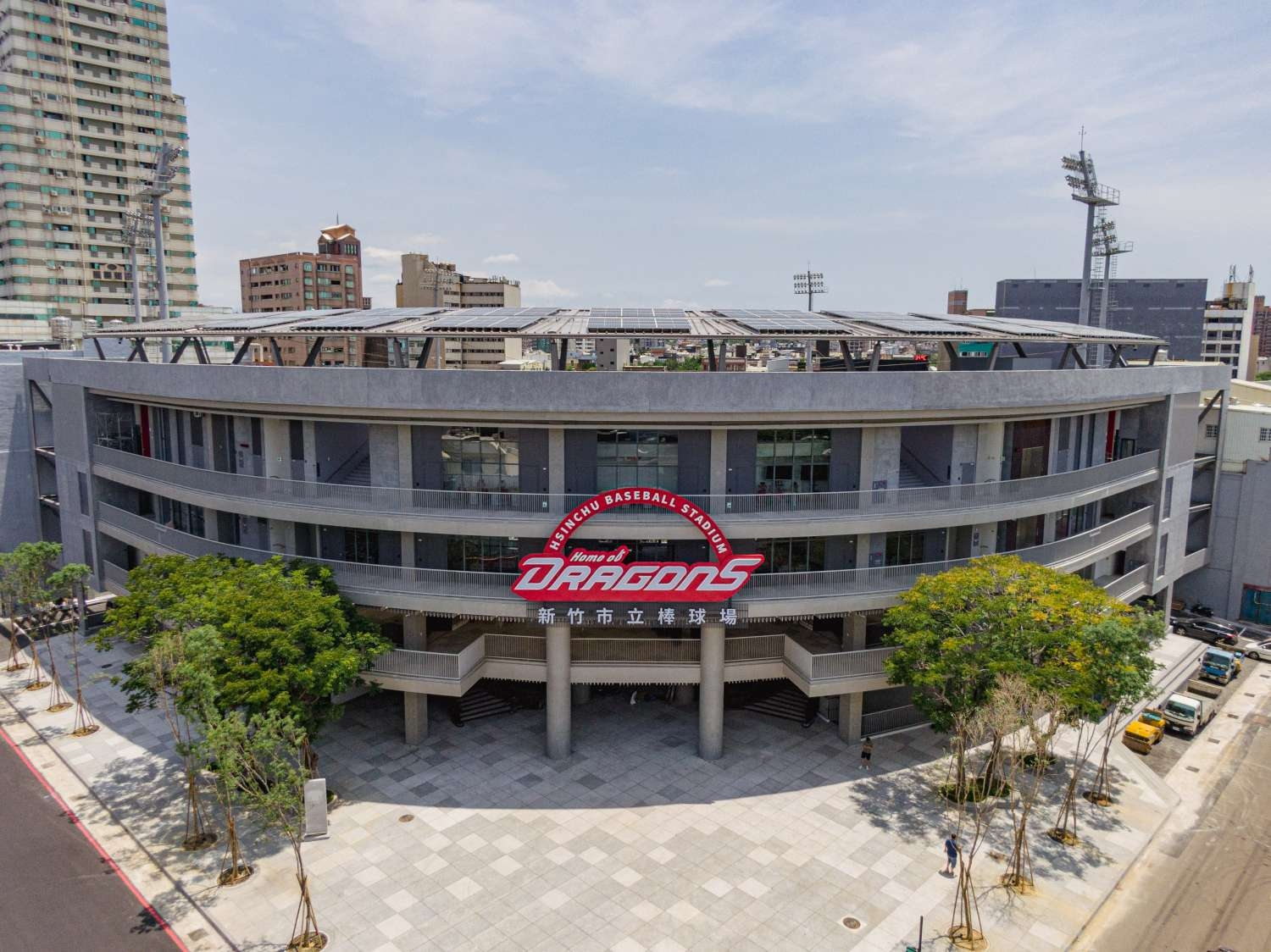
Hsinchu Baseball Stadium

Some tourist attractions in Hsinchu include:

- Aqueduct Museum of Hsinchu City
- Black Bat Squadron Memorial Hall
- Chenghuang Temple of Hsinchu
- Glass Museum of Hsinchu City
- Hsinchu City Art Site of Railway Warehouse
- Hsinchu CKS Baseball Stadium
- Hsinchu Museum of Military Dependents Village
- Hsinchu Fish Harbor
- Hsinchu Zoo
- National Hsinchu Living Arts Center
- 17 Kilometer Coastal Scenic Area
- Green Grass Lake
- Chenghuang Temple Night Market – Most of the old stands in Cheng-huang Temple are of 50-year-old history, known snacks here include Hsin-chu meatballs, pork balls, spring rolls, braised pork rice, cuttlefish thick soup, rice noodles, and cow tongue-shaped cakes.
- Neiwan Old Street – Traditional Hakka restaurants that serve ginger-lily-flavored glutinous rice dumplings, Hakka tea, and Hakka rice cakes.

== Sports ==
Taiwan's Chinese Professional Baseball League has a professional baseball team, Wei Chuan Dragons, based in Hsinchu.

Major sporting events held by Hsinchu include:

- 1997 World Youth Baseball Championship
- 2005 BWF Para-Badminton World Championships

== Transportation ==
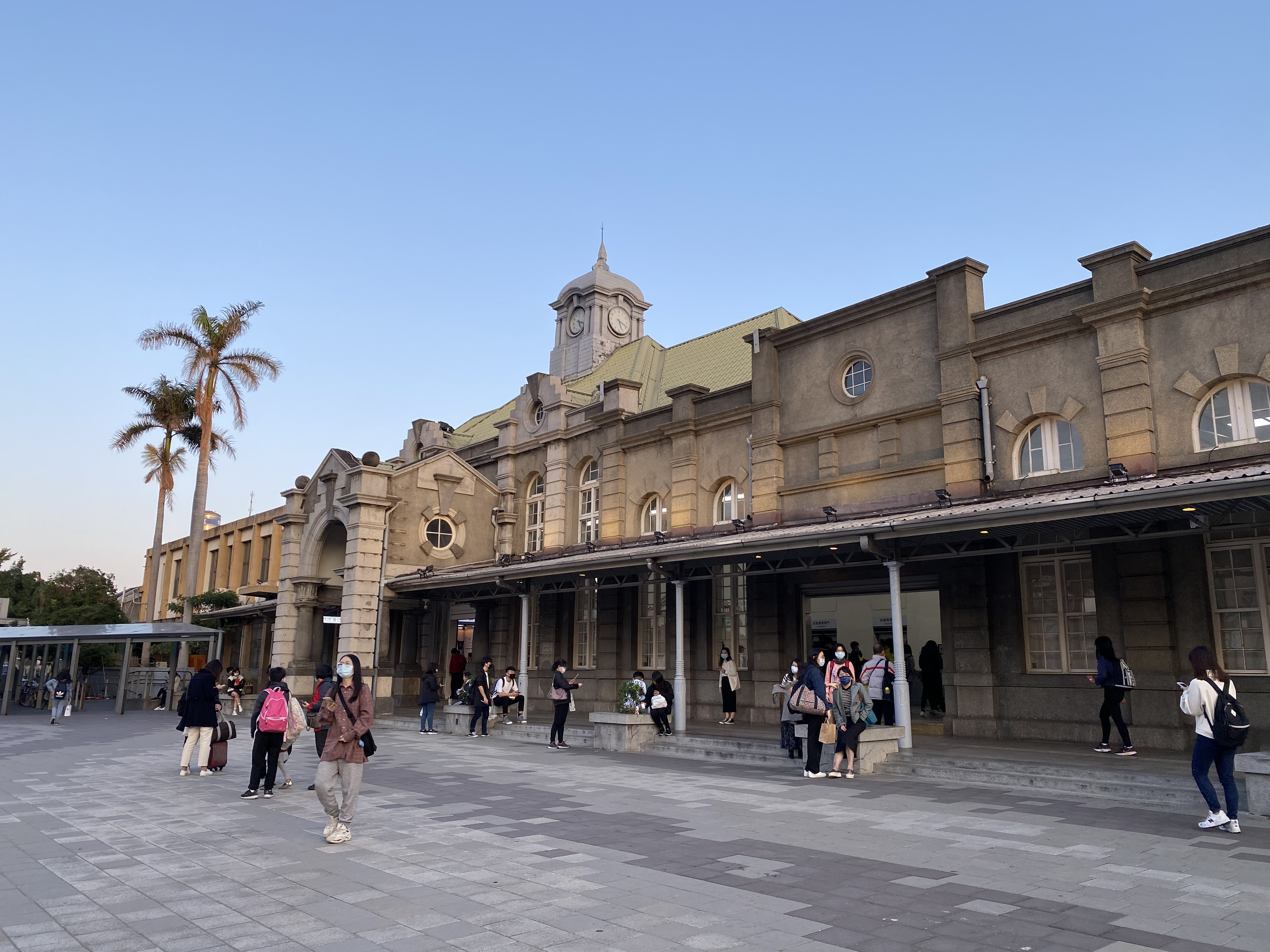
Hsinchu railway station

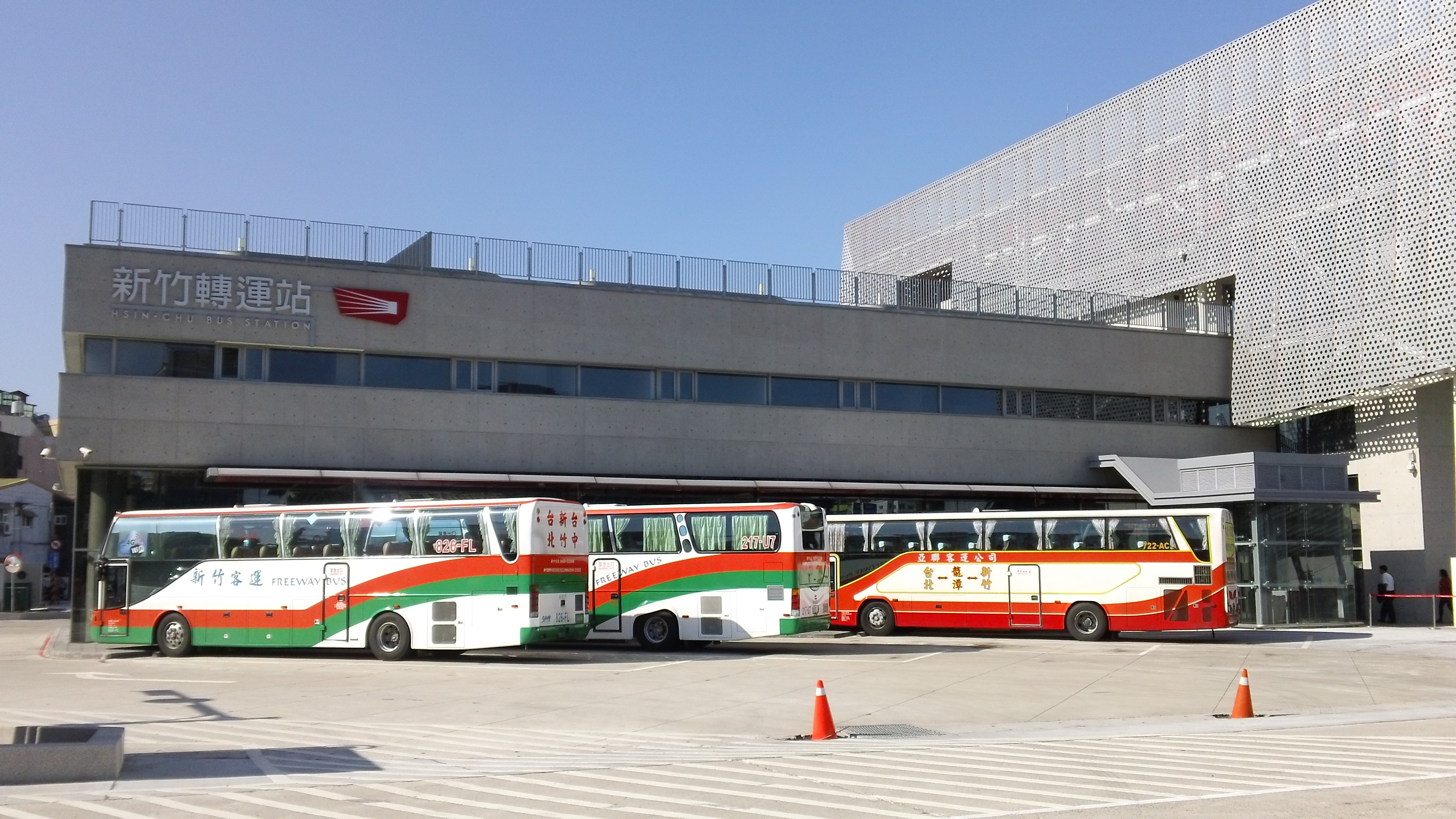
Hsinchu Bus Station

=== Rail ===
Hsinchu City is mainly served by Hsinchu railway station, along with five other minor TRA stations on both the Western Trunk line and the Neiwan line. There is also an HSR station in nearby Zhubei, Hsinchu County on Taiwan High Speed Rail.

=== Cycling ===
Hsinchu City has recently created a series of cycling routes. Hsinchu is home to many cycling clubs.

=== Sea ports ===
Fishing ports are located at Nanliao Street, North District, and Haishan, Xiangshan.

=== Airport ===
Hsinchu Airport is located in the North District and is mainly used as a military airbase. The nearest international airport is Taoyuan International Airport, which is located 58 km away from the city.

== Notable people ==
- Chi Cheng, the 1968 Olympic bronze medalist in track and field
- Yuan T. Lee, 1986 Nobel Laureate in Chemistry
- Chiang Hsiao-yen, Vice Premier (1997)
- Lin Cho-liang, Taiwanese American violinist
- Hsieh Su-Wei, Taiwanese tennis player and former World No. 1 in doubles
- Hebe Tien, solo artist and member of the S.H.E
- David Wu, member of the U.S. House of Representatives for the state of Oregon from 1999 until 2011.
- Cyndi Wang, singer
- Chen Qiaoen, singer, actress, 7F Member
- Lü Shao-chia, Taiwanese conductor
- Wen Shang-Yi, guitarist and leader of the band Mayday
- Lin Shih Chia, Archer
- Tan Ya Ting, Archer
- Sheu Yuan-dong, politician

== International relations ==
=== Twin towns – sister cities ===
Hsinchu is twinned with:

| City | Region | Country | Since |
|---|---|---|---|
| Beaverton | Oregon | United States | 1988 |
| Cary | North Carolina | United States | 1993 |
| Cupertino | California | United States | 1998 |
| Richland | Washington | United States | 1988 |
| Plano | Texas | United States | 2003 |
| Okayama | Okayama Prefecture | Japan | 2003 |
| Puerto Princesa | Palawan | Philippines | 2006 |
| Fairfield | New South Wales | Australia | 1994 |
| Chiayi City | Taiwan | Taiwan | 2002 |
| Airai | Airai | Palau | 2011 |

== See also ==
- Administrative divisions of the Republic of China
- List of cities in Taiwan
