= History of Hsinchu =

History of Hsinchu, Taiwan

The history of Hsinchu extends over more than 400 years, making it one of the oldest cities in northern Taiwan.

== Early history ==
The first settlers in the city of Hsinchu were the aboriginal plains tribe known as Taokas. Prior to the arrival of the Han Chinese, the area around Hsinchu was held by the Taokas, the Saisiyat, and the Atayal. Originally, they settled by the coast of the Siangshan Wetlands and then gradually expanded northeast, cultivating the area.

== Ming Empire ==
The Spanish occupied northern Taiwan in the 17th century. Catholic missionaries reached the settlement of Tek-kham in 1626. The Hokkien name, literally meaning "Bamboo Barrier", may transcribe an aboriginal word for "seashore". In 1642, the Dutch drove out the Spanish from Taiwan. Dutch Formosa ended with the Siege of Fort Zeelandia in 1662. The Kingdom of Tungning then ruled part of southwestern Taiwan in the name of the Ming until 1683.

== Qing Empire ==
In 1684, Zhuluo County was established during Qing Dynasty rule, initially encompassing the underdeveloped northern two-thirds of Taiwan. Wang Shih-chieh, from Kinmen, was the first Han settler to reside in Tek-kham and cultivate farmland. Over 180 others followed, establishing a settlement alongside what later became Dongqian Street in East District, Hsinchu, in 1711.

By 1723, the Qing Empire split Zhuluo into three sections. One of them was Tamsui Subprefecture, corresponding to modern-day Taipei, New Taipei, Keelung, Taoyuan, Hsinchu City and County, and Miaoli.

Tek-kham was surrounded by bamboo groves used as defense walls and gates. In 1825, these natural defenses were removed and replaced with brick and stone walls, except the East Gate.

In 1877, Tamsui Subprefecture was abolished. As part of the reorganization of Taiwan by Shen Baozhen, the viceroy of Liangjiang, Zhuqian Subprefecture (i.e., Tek-kham) was raised to the level of a county and renamed Hsinchu (i.e., Sin-tek or Xinzhu) in 1878. By 1887, Taipeh Prefecture consisted of the counties of Tamsui, Gilan, and Hsinchu.

In the late 19th century, the Hoklo dominated the coastal plain area, forcing the Saisiyat and Atayal tribes to move to Jianshi and Wufeng, while the Hakka and Taokas settled together in the river valleys and hills area.

By the end of 1893, the railway from Keelung crossed the Taipei Bridge and regular service was opened over the entire 60 mi (97 km) line.

== Empire of Japan ==
During the first years of Japanese rule following the First Sino-Japanese War, the political divisions of the island were changed frequently. By 1901, the city—known at the time as Shinchiku—was the head of a subprefecture ("chō"), one of twenty spread around the island. It was the main administrative center between Taipei (then "Taihoku") and Taichung (then "Taichū") and among the province's most populous towns. In 1904, its 16,371 residents ranked it in 7th place, behind Keelung and ahead of Changhua ("Shoka").

Roads and railways were built but many traditional buildings—even the city wall surrounding the former headquarters of the Tamsui Subprefecture—were demolished. During this time, "Shinchiku" first became a center for glass making.

"Shinchiku" was raised to town (街) status in 1920; a town district office was established within the Shinchiku District of Shinchiku Prefecture. It was raised to city status in 1930; the town district office becoming a city office. At the same time, it became the seat of Shinchiku Prefecture, which eventually encompassed modern-day Hsinchu City, Hsinchu County, Taoyuan City, and Miaoli County. In 1941, its prefecture was expanded, annexing Xiangshan ("Kōzan"). Jiugang (t 舊港莊, s 旧港庄, "Old Harbor Village" and the Japanese "Kyūminato") and Liujia (t 六家莊, s 六家庄, "Six-Family Village" and the Japanese "Rokka") merged to become Zhubei (t 竹北莊, s 竹北庄, "North of Xinzhu" and the Japanese "Chikuhoku").

== Republic of China ==
After the handover of Taiwan from Japan to the Republic of China after World War II, the Nationalist government under the Kuomintang established the Hsinchu City Government and focused on the industrial development of the area. Hsinchu County was established to be part of Taiwan Province on 25 December 1945.

In 1946, the Take-Over Committee dissolved and replaced by the Hsinchu County Government, located in Taoyuan. As the administrative districts were readjusted, Hsinchu was granted city status. It used the old prefecture office as its city hall at 120 Chung Cheng Road. In February 1946, representative congresses were formed for seven district offices. On April 15, the city congress was formed. Provincial representatives were elected from among the city legislators.

The government of the Republic of China, which forced themselves to Taiwan after losing the mainland to the Chinese Communist Party in the Chinese Civil War in 1949, the administrative districts on Taiwan were re-adjusted once again on 16 August 1950, demarcating 16 counties and 5 provincially-governed cities.

In 1980, the government established the "Science Park", which significantly improved the area's economy. In June 1982, under presidential order, the Xiangshan Township of Hsinchu County merged into Hsinchu City. A new municipal government was formally established on 1 July 1982, comprising 103 villages and 1,635 neighborhoods. These were organized into the East, North, and Xiangshan districts by 1 November. By June 1983, the new government consisted of three bureaus (Civil Service, Public Works, and Education), four departments (Finance, Social Welfare, Compulsory Military Service, and Land Affairs), four offices (Secretary, Planning, Personnel, and Auditing), and 49 various sections. The Police Department, Tax Department, and Medicine and Hygiene Department were considered affiliate institutions.

From 1994 to 1999, as Taiwan made its transition from authoritarian rule to a representative democracy and the mostly pro forma provincial level of government began to be streamlined, regulations were established for the self-government of Hsinchu. A deputy mayor, consumer officer, and three consultants were added to the city government. In 2002, the city added a Bureau of Labor and transferred Compulsory Military Service to the Department of Civil Service. In 2018, the ROC central government de facto dissolved the provincial government.

Hsinchu is located in a favourable spot: it is about one hour from Taipei, Taoyuan International Airport, and Taichung. The Hsinchu Science and Industrial Park develops high-tech research and products, specialising in the areas of semiconductors, computers, information technology and optical engineering.
