= 2023 Zhubei gas explosion incident =

Gas explosion in Taiwan

2023 Zhubei Gas Explosion Incident
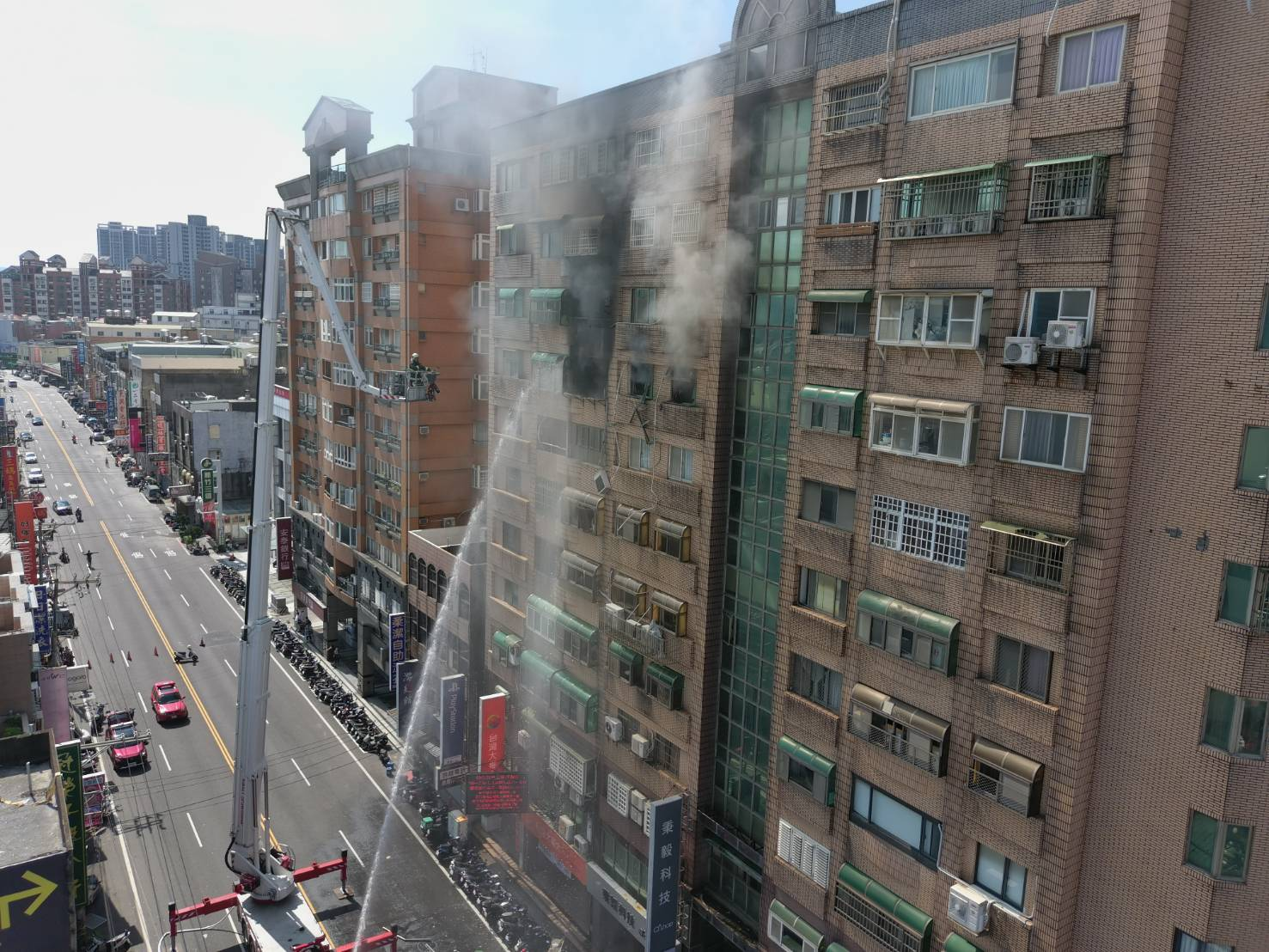
- Smoke billowing from a building following the explosion
- Date: 24 June 2023
- Time: 08:00 (UTC+8)
- Location: Zhongzheng East Road, Zhubei, Hsinchu County, Taiwan; 24.839589°N 121.004025°E
- Type: Explosion
- Cause: Petrochemical gas leak and explosion
- Deaths: 0
- Injuries: 1 seriously injured, 5 slightly injured
- Property damage: Unknown

The 2023 Zhubei Gas Explosion Incident was a petrochemical gas explosion that occurred in Zhubei City, Hsinchu County, Republic of China (Taiwan), between the morning of 24 June and the early hours of 25 June 2023. At approximately 8:00 a.m. on 24 June, abnormalities were detected in the gas pressure monitoring system in Zhubei City, followed by multiple reports of gas leaks and residential fires. The resulting gas explosions damaged numerous homes and businesses, and more than 76 people required temporary shelter. That evening, a suspected gas leak was again reported near the main affected area. The Hsinchu County Fire Bureau and Hsinchu Gas Company arrived at the scene at 9:31 p.m. and detected gas concentrations as high as 20,000 ppm. Indoor gas concentrations did not fall below 100 ppm until around 11:30 p.m.

== Incident ==
According to the Hsinchu County Fire Bureau, beginning at 8:14 a.m., police and firefighters received a large number of emergency calls, causing reporting lines to become fully occupied. Multiple gas leaks were reported across six villages in Zhubei City. After verification, authorities confirmed a total of 15 gas leak cases and 12 residential fires. At 8:31 a.m., emergency services received reports of a gas explosion in an apartment building on Zhongzheng East Road, and ambulances arrived at the scene at 8:41 a.m.

The Fire Bureau later stated that residents had reported gas odors at more than ten locations in Zhubei City, including Taiyuan Street, Sanmin Road, Heping Street, Wenhua Street, Guangming 2nd Street, Jianguo Street, Renyi Road, Bo'ai Street, and Zhongshan Road.

The most seriously injured victim was a 16-year-old boy surnamed Chen, a resident of the "Emperor Supreme" apartment building on Zhongzheng East Road. He had been asleep when the explosion occurred. His mother, who worked as a nurse, immediately poured cold water over him to treat his burns. As ambulances had not yet arrived, he was taken by private vehicle to the emergency department of Ton-Yen General Hospital and was later transferred to Linkou Chang Gung Memorial Hospital for further treatment.

After arriving at the scene, firefighters conducted floor-by-floor searches, rescuing five people from the ninth floor and seven people from the eleventh floor. However, due to safety concerns, the Hsinchu County Government announced that all residents would be required to stay elsewhere temporarily until Hsinchu Gas Company completed structural safety inspections.

== Aftermath ==
Following the incident, Hsinchu Gas Company vice president Liu Hsien-jung stated that residents should check whether gas pressure was excessively high when turning on gas appliances, prompting criticism from members of the public, who responded, "How would we know?"

Following the incident, the neighboring Hsinchu City Government instructed the Fire Bureau and the Department of Industrial Development to immediately inspect the city's gas supply system. After confirming with Hsinchu Gas Company that no abnormalities existed, authorities announced that gas supplies remained normal. Hsinchu Gas Company further clarified that the gas supply systems serving Hsinchu City and the Zhubei area of Hsinchu County were separate and did not affect one another.

Mayor of Zhubei Cheng Chao-fangstated that, as of 9:45 p.m. on 24 June, the Zhubei City Office had contacted 50 households comprising 153 individuals, with nearly 40 people requiring temporary accommodation.

On 25 June, the Hsinchu County Fire Bureau stated that from the previous afternoon through that morning, personnel had used five-gas detectors to inspect individual households for residual gas. Hsinchu Gas Company announced on the same day that it had received assistance from seven personnel from Zhujian Gas Company in Miaoli County, seven from Hsin Tao Gas Company, and ten from CPC Corporation, Taiwan, to conduct pipeline inspections in several communities in Zhubei City. The company also obtained residents' consent to replace microcomputer gas meters free of charge.

On 26 June, Hsinchu Gas Company cooperated with the Gas Utilities Association of the Republic of China to inspect gas safety in affected communities and stated that safety inspections had been completed for more than 800 households.

== Subsequent Accountability ==
=== Legal responsibility ===
On the day of the incident, the Hsinchu District Prosecutors Office assigned a dedicated prosecutor to proactively investigate the case as a public safety offense.That evening, it announced that it had instructed the Zhubei Precinct of the Hsinchu County Police Bureau to collect information regarding the cause of the explosion and had opened an investigation under a "Ta" case designation. The following day, prosecutors returned to the explosion site to conduct a preliminary investigation into the cause of the incident. Chief Prosecutor Tsou Mao-yu stated that the actual cause of the fire would have to await completion of the Fire Bureau's investigation and a comprehensive fire investigation report, which would serve as the basis for prosecutorial inquiries.

Hsinchu County Deputy Magistrate Chen Chien-hsien stated on the day of the incident that the county government would assist victims in applying forstate compensation Law and characterized the incident as an accident. On 26 June, he apologized to the public, saying that describing the incident as an "industrial safety accident" before the cause had been clarified had been inappropriate. Hsinchu County Magistrate Yang Wen-ke stated that the county government would assume full responsibility for post-disaster reconstruction, including covering medical expenses, rehabilitation costs, psychological counseling, and property losses.

On 27 June, Hsinchu Gas Company General Manager Chiu Shih-chang announced that each affected resident would receive an additional NT$5,000 condolence payment, with a maximum of five people per household. The daily accommodation subsidy would also be increased from NT$1,200 to NT$2,000 per person, with fourteen days of payments to be made in advance.

Subsequently, Hsinchu Gas Company paid NT$110 million in compensation and reached settlements with all affected residents. On 22 May 2025, the Hsinchu District Prosecutors Office concluded its investigation and indicted three individuals, including the then-manager of Hsinchu Gas Company. Hsinchu Gas Company also issued a statement apologizing for the incident.

=== Political responsibility ===
On the day of the incident, Hsinchu County Magistrate Yang Wen-ke stated that the Emergency Operations Center had been activated at Level 3, but he was not present to direct operations. Rumors initially circulated that he had tested positive for COVID-19 pandemic in Taiwan, while later reports indicated that he was attending a previously scheduled engagement and would return shortly. He ultimately returned to Taiwan from Japan by air at around 9:00 p.m. Deputy Magistrate Chen Chien-hsien later stated that he had responded that way because he did not know the magistrate's whereabouts at the time.

Democratic Progressive Party Hsinchu County Councilor Ou-yang Ting posted photos on Facebook showing Yang playing golf in Japan and questioned, "If he went abroad, then he went abroad. Why tell everyone he had COVID?" The Hsinchu County Government responded that Yang had changed his schedule and returned to Taiwan immediately after learning of the accident and emphasized that the trip to Japan had been a self-funded official visit. Yang later stated that he had indeed been diagnosed with COVID-19 the previous week and had taken advantage of the Dragon Boat Festival public holiday in Taiwan abroad on a trip that had been arranged well in advance, insisting that he had not concealed anything.

Wei Wen-yuan, Director of the Information and Public Relations Department of the Hsinchu County Government, stated that the government had never concealed, nor needed to conceal, Yang's overseas trip. He noted that Yang had publicly announced during a departmental meeting on 20 June that he would take leave from 21 to 25 June, and that media reporters had been present throughout.

Following the incident, a recall election campaign against Yang Wen-ke was launched in Hsinchu County. Yu Hsiao-ching, a former Hsinchu County councilor from the Green Party Taiwan, stated that Yang's handling of incidents including the Zhubei sinkhole incident, the Hukou Life Memorial Park controversy, and the Zhubei gas explosion had left residents deeply disappointed. She emphasized that the recall campaign had not been initiated by her but had arisen spontaneously from public sentiment. Wei Wen-yuan responded in an interview that he was unaware of the reasons or objectives behind the recall effort.

== Related incident ==
Following the gas leak in Zhubei, former Hukou Township representative Wan Cheng-ying of the Kuomintang stated that gas leaks had also been detected near the intersection of Shengli Road and Yong'an Street, adjacent to Tieqi Bridge in Hukou Township. At 3:35 p.m., the Xingong Branch of the Third Brigade of the Hsinchu County Fire Bureau arrived at the scene and detected no gas leakage before withdrawing.

At approximately 5:00 p.m., Hsinchu Gas Company arrived and measured gas concentrations as high as 3,700 ppm, confirming the existence of a gas leak, although authorities assessed that there was no immediate danger. However, because personnel were occupied with repair work in Zhubei, the leak could not be addressed immediately. Residents were advised to avoid the area and refrain from using any open flames nearby.

The Hsinchu County Government later stated that the gas leak had been repaired by a contracted maintenance company and emphasized that the Hukou gas leak case was unrelated to the Zhubei incident.
