= Tai Yuen Hi-Tech Industrial Park =

Industrial park in Zhubei, Hsinchu County, Taiwan

Tai Yuen Hi-Tech Industrial Park 台元科技園區

- Location within Hsinchu County
- Location: Zhubei, Hsinchu County, Taiwan
- Coordinates: 24°50′35.7″N 121°00′55.3″E
- Opening date: July 2001
- Architect: industrial park
- Website: Official website

The Tai Yuen Hi-Tech Industrial Park (traditional Chinese: 台元科技園區; simplified Chinese: 台元科技园区; pinyin: Táiyuán Kējì Yuánqū) is an industrial park in Zhubei City, Hsinchu County, Taiwan.

== History ==
The industrial park was opened in July 2001.

== Transportation ==
The industrial park is accessible within walking distance east of Zhubei Station of Taiwan Railway.

== See also ==
- Hsinchu Science and Industrial Park
