= TUST =

TUST may refer to:

- Ta Hwa University of Science and Technology in Taiwan
- Tianjin University of Science and Technology in Tianjin
