= Liujia =

Liujia may refer to:

- Lioujia District, a district in Tainan, Taiwan
- Liujia line, a railway line in Hsinchu County, Taiwan
- Liujia railway station, a railway station in Zhubei, Hsinchu County, Taiwan
- Liujia village (劉家村), a village in Zhangdian District of Zibo city in Shandong province, China
- Liù jiā (六家), six schools of thought during the Warring States period
