= Shinchiku Prefecture =

Prefecture of Taiwan under Japanese rule

Shinchiku Prefecture 新竹州
- Shinchiku-shū
- 1920-1952
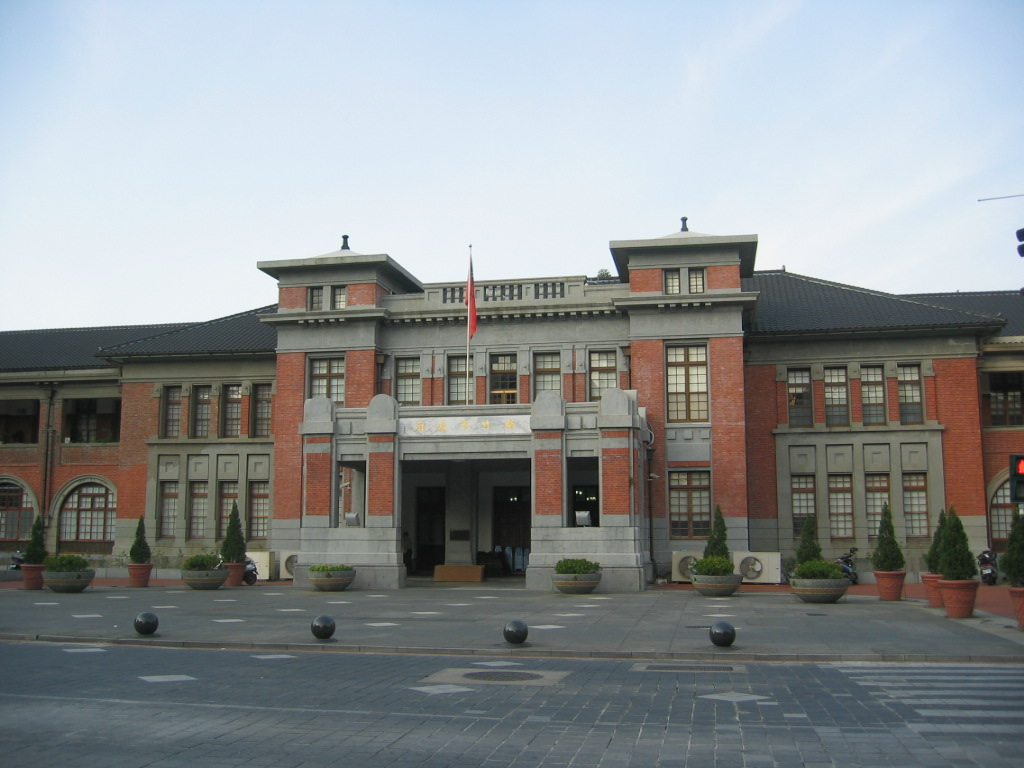
- The Shinchiku Prefecture government building was constructed in 1915 and now serves as the Hsinchu City Government building
- Capital: Hsinchu
- Population
  - 1941: 838.011
- Historical era: Taiwan under Japanese rule
  - Established: 1920
  - Disestablished: 25 October 1945
  - Treaty of San Francisco: 28 April 1952
- Political subdivisions: 1 city (市); 8 districts (郡)
- Today part of: Hsinchu City, Taoyuan City, Hsinchu County, Miaoli County

Shinchiku Prefecture

Shinchiku Prefecture (新竹州, Shinchiku-shū) was one of the administrative divisions of Taiwan during the Japanese era. The prefecture consisted of modern-day Hsinchu City, Hsinchu County, Taoyuan City, and Miaoli County.

== Population ==
Japanese	20,693
Taiwanese	815,274
Koreans	150
Other	1,894
Total population	838,011
1941 (Showa 16) census.

== Administrative divisions ==
=== Cities and districts ===
In 1945 (Showa 20), there were 1 city and 8 districts under Shinchiku Prefecture.

- Shinchiku City (新竹市)
  - Shinchiku District (新竹郡)
  - Chūreki District (中壢郡)
  - Tōen District (桃園郡)
  - Daikei District (大溪郡)
  - Chikutō District (竹東郡)
  - Chikunan District (竹南郡)
  - Byōritsu District (苗栗郡)
  - Taiko District (大湖郡)

=== Towns and villages ===
The districts are divided into towns (街) and villages (庄).

District	Name	Japanese	Notes
Shinchiku 新竹郡	Shimpo town	新埔街	Today Xinpu Township
Shinchiku 新竹郡	Kansai town	關西街	Today Guanxi Township
Shinchiku 新竹郡	Chikuhoku village	竹北庄	Today Zhubei City
Shinchiku 新竹郡	Kōmō village	紅毛庄	Today Xinfeng Township
Shinchiku 新竹郡	Kokō village	湖口庄	Today Hukou Township
Shinchiku 新竹郡	Aboriginal Area	蕃地	Today part of Guanxi Township
Shinchiku 新竹郡	Shinchiku town	新竹街	Upgraded to a city in 1930. Today Hsinchu
Shinchiku 新竹郡	Kyūminato village	旧港庄	Abolished in 1941, became Chikuhoku village
Shinchiku 新竹郡	Rokka village	六家庄	Abolished in 1941, became Chikuhoku village
Shinchiku 新竹郡	Kōzan village	香山庄	Abolished in 1941, annexed into Shinchiku City. Today Xiangshan District
Chūreki 中壢郡	Chūreki town	中壢街	Today Zhongli District
Chūreki 中壢郡	Yōbai town	楊梅街	Today Yangmei District
Chūreki 中壢郡	Heichin village	平鎮庄	Today Pingzhen District
Chūreki 中壢郡	Shin'oku village	新屋庄	Today Xinwu District
Chūreki 中壢郡	Kan'on village	觀音庄	Today Guanyin District
Tōen 桃園郡	Tōen town	桃園街	Today Taoyuan District
Tōen 桃園郡	Rochiku village	蘆竹庄	Today Luzhu District
Tōen 桃園郡	Ōsono village	大園庄	Today Dayuan District
Tōen 桃園郡	Kameyama village	龜山庄	Today Guishan District
Tōen 桃園郡	Hachikai village	八塊庄	Today Bade District
Daikei 大渓郡	Daikei town	大溪街	Today Daxi District
Daikei 大渓郡	Ryūtan village	龍潭庄	Today Longtan District
Daikei 大渓郡	Aboriginal Area	蕃地	Today Fuxing District
Chikutō 竹東郡	Chikutō town	竹東街	Today Zhudong Township
Chikutō 竹東郡	Kyūrin village	芎林庄	Today Qionglin Township
Chikutō 竹東郡	Yokoyama village	橫山庄	Today Hengshan Township
Chikutō 竹東郡	Hoppo village	北埔庄	Today Beipu Township
Chikutō 竹東郡	Gabi village	峨嵋庄	Today Emei Township
Chikutō 竹東郡	Hōzan village	寶山庄	Today Baoshan Township
Chikutō 竹東郡	Aboriginal Area	蕃地	Today Jianshi Township and Wufeng Township
Chikunan 竹南郡	Chikunan town	竹南街	Today Zhunan Township
Chikunan 竹南郡	Tōfun town	頭份街	Today Toufen Township
Chikunan 竹南郡	Sanwan village	三灣庄	Today Sanwan Township
Chikunan 竹南郡	Nan village	南庄	Today Nanzhuang Township
Chikunan 竹南郡	Zōkyō village	造橋庄	Today Zaoqiao Township
Chikunan 竹南郡	Kōryū village	後龍庄	Today Houlong Township
Chikunan 竹南郡	Aboriginal Area	蕃地	Today part of Nanzhuang Township
Byōritsu 苗栗郡	Byōritsu town	苗栗街	Today Miaoli City
Byōritsu 苗栗郡	Enri town	苑裡街	Today Yuanli Township
Byōritsu 苗栗郡	Tōoku village	頭屋庄	Today Touwu Township
Byōritsu 苗栗郡	Kōkan village	公館庄	Today Gongguan Township
Byōritsu 苗栗郡	Dora village	銅鑼庄	Today Tongluo Township
Byōritsu 苗栗郡	Sansa village	三叉庄	Today Sanyi Township
Byōritsu 苗栗郡	Tsūshō village	通霄庄	Today Tongxiao Township
Byōritsu 苗栗郡	Shiko village	四湖庄	Today Sihu Township
Taiko 大湖郡	Taiko village	大湖庄	Today Dahu Township
Taiko 大湖郡	Shitan village	獅潭庄	Today Shitan Township
Taiko 大湖郡	Takuran village	卓蘭庄	Today Zhuolan Township
Taiko 大湖郡	Aboriginal Area	蕃地	Today Tai'an Township

== Shintō shrines ==
- Shinchiku Shrine
- Tsūshō Shrine
- Tōen Shrine (now Taoyuan County Martyr's Shrine)
- Byōritsu Shrine
- Chūreki Shrine
- Tōfun Shrine
- Chikunan Shrine
- Taigo Shrine
- Chikutō Shrine

== Famous people ==
List of notable people born in Shinchiku Prefecture during Japanese rule:

- Peter Huang (黄文雄, independence activist, social commentator in Japan, chairman of Amnesty International Taiwan in the late 2000s) (born 2 October 1937)
- Sheu Yuan-dong (許遠東, politician, 14th governor of Taiwan's central bank, born 22 May 1927, died 16 February 1998 in the crash of China Airlines Flight 676)

== See also ==
- Political divisions of Taiwan (1895-1945)
- Governor-General of Taiwan
- Taiwan under Japanese rule
- Administrative divisions of the Republic of China
