= Yang Wen-ke =

Taiwanese politician (born 1951)

- 楊文科
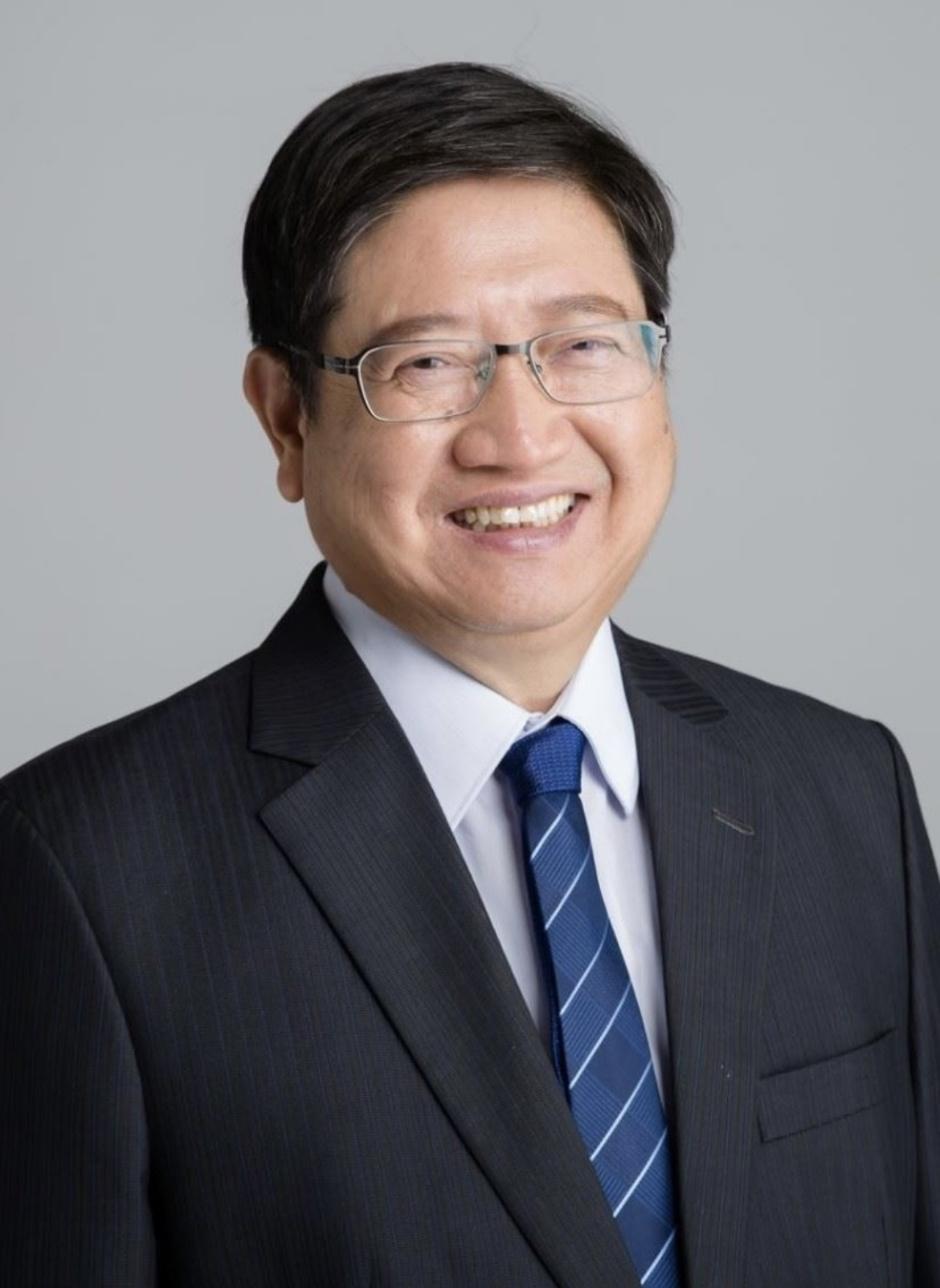
- Official portrait, 2018

11th Magistrate of Hsinchu County
- Incumbent
- Assumed office 25 December 2018
- Deputy: Chen Jian-hsien
- Preceded by: Chiu Ching-chun

10th Deputy Magistrate of Hsinchu
- In office 16 July 2016 – 31 July 2018
- Magistrate: Chiu Ching-chun
- Preceded by: Hsu Kan-mei
- Succeeded by: Chen Jian-hsien

Personal details
- Born: 22 March 1951 (age 75) Emei, Hsinchu County, Taiwan
- Party: Kuomintang
- Education: China University of Technology (BS); Chinese Culture University (MBA); Chung Hua University (MS)

Yang Wen-ke (Chinese: 楊文科; pinyin: Yáng Wénkē; born 22 March 1951) is a Taiwanese politician who is the current magistrate of Hsinchu County since 25 December 2018 after winning the 2018 Taiwanese local elections on 24 November 2018.

== Education ==
Yang graduated from China University of Technology with a bachelor's degree in public relations and earned his Master of Business Administration (M.B.A.) degree specializing in land economics from Chinese Culture University. In 2009, he earned a Master of Science (M.S.) in technology management from Chung Hua University.

== Political career ==
=== Hsinchu County deputy magistrate ===
On 1 October 2016, Yang attended the North Taiwan Regional Development Committee's deputy leaders meeting held at Kinmen to discuss the expanded Taiwan Agricultural Product Joint Sales Exhibition. Yang participated by bringing high-quality agricultural produce from Hsinchu County to the exhibition to help promoting them.

=== 2018 Hsinchu County magistrate election ===
On 13 June 2018, the Central Standing Committee of Kuomintang accepted the nomination of Yang as the party's candidate for the 2018 local election.

2018 Kuomintang Hsinchu County magistrate primary results
Candidates	Place	Results
Yang Wen-ke	Called In	Walkover
Lin Wei-chou	Failure to get party's nomination	-

2018 Hsinchu County mayoral results
No.	Candidate	Party	Votes	Percentage	Elected
1	Yang Wen-ke	Kuomintang	107,877	38.20%	
2	Yeh Fang-tung (葉芳棟)	Independent	5,168	1.83%	
3	Cheng Chao-fang (鄭朝方)	Democratic Progressive Party	78,170	27.68%	
4	Hsu Hsin-ying	Minkuotang	91,190	32.29%	
Total voters			427,652		
Valid votes			282,405		
Invalid votes					
Voter turnout			66.03%		

=== Bribery investigation and indictment ===
In July 2024, following a probe into mismanagement of the Wonder World 520 project that led to several construction site incidents, Hsinchu prosecutors indicted Yang along with other officials on charges of profiting from bribes and abuse of authority in connection with the real estate project in Jhubei.
