= Ta Hwa University of Science and Technology =

Private university in Hsinchu County, Taiwan

Minth University of Science and Technology
- 敏實科技大學
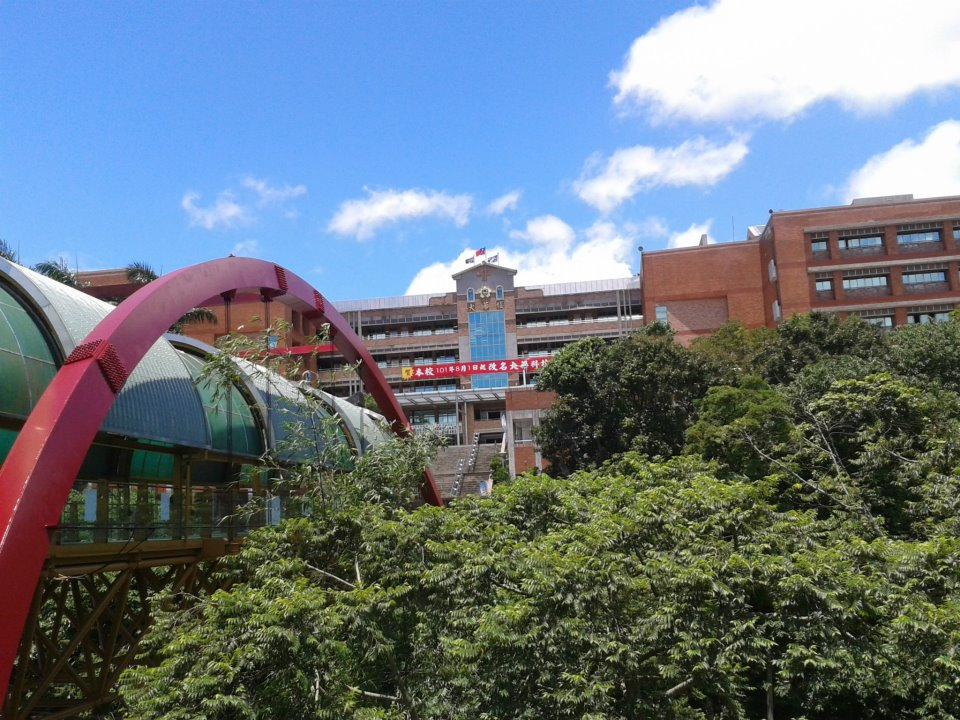
- Type: Private
- Established: June 1967 (as Ta Hwa Agricultural Junior College); 2012 (as TUST)
- Chancellor: TSENG HSIN CHAO (曾信超)
- Location: Qionglin, Hsinchu County, Taiwan; 24.7775247°N 121.0900718°E
- Language: Chineses
- Website: Official website

Ta Hwa University of Science and Technology
- Traditional Chinese: 敏實科技大學
- Simplified Chinese: 敏实科技大学
Transcriptions
Standard Mandarin
- Hanyu Pinyin: Dàhuá Kējì Dàxué
Southern Min
- Hokkien POJ: Bín-si̍t Kho-ki Tāi-ha̍k

Minth University of Science and Technology (MUST; Chinese: 敏實科技大學; Pe̍h-ōe-jī: Bín-si̍t Kho-ki Tāi-ha̍k) is a private university in Qionglin Township, Hsinchu County, Taiwan.

== History ==
Since the establishment of the school in 1967, it was originally named Tahua University of Science and Technology. It is one of the most important technical and vocational universities in Taiwan. It has developed for 54 years and has a long history of achievement and development. The school is located near the most important science park in Taiwan. More than 60,000 alumni have made a huge contribution to Taiwan's economic development.

In 2019, Mr. Qin

Ronghua, the founder of Minth Group, the world top 100 automotive group, donate huge capital to university and fully promote the sustainable development of school affairs.

In 2021, the Ministry of Education approved the admission of students to the Smart Manufacturing Engineering Department and the Smart Vehicle and Energy Department to cultivate AI manufacturing and application talents. The school is also Renamed to: Minth University of Technology and Science to foster closer relationship with the Minth Global Group.

The global resources of Minth Group are the strong backing for the development of the university which is dedicated to the sustainable operation and training of talents with holistic corporate values and DNA.

The school's mission is necessary to develop and establish a new model of enterprise education with the high-quality orientation of the Minth Group’s corporate value. It has also set out the ambition, vision and value for this transformation:

- Vision:T o manage an artificial intelligence professional university that is innovative, practical and employable. A forward-looking and influential first-rate university of science and technology.
- Value: With the whole-person education of "smart thinking and practical", cultivate enterprise innovative talents with forward-looking morality, humanistic quality, international vision and science and technology specialty.

== Transportation ==
The university is accessible East from Shangyuan Station of the Taiwan Railway.

== See also ==
- List of universities in Taiwan
