= Liujia railway station =

Railway station in Zhubei, Hsinchu County, Taiwan

Liujia 六家車站
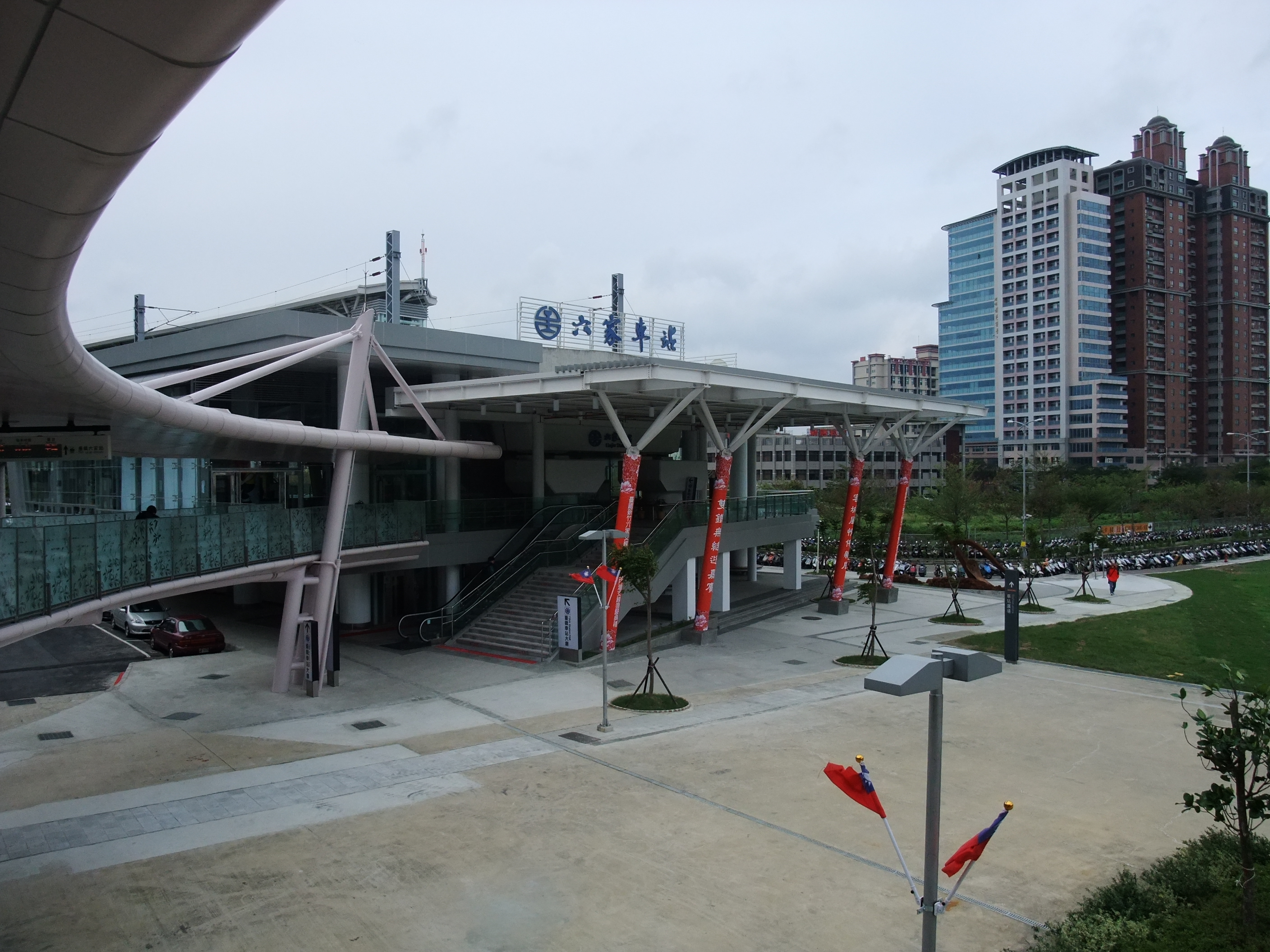

General information
- Location: Zhubei, Hsinchu County, Taiwan
- Coordinates: 24°48′25.6″N 121°02′21.4″E
- System: Train station
- Owner: Taiwan Railway Corporation
- Operator: Taiwan Railway Corporation
- Line: Liujia
- Train operators: Taiwan Railway Corporation

History
- Opened: 11 November 2011

Services
Preceding station	Taiwan Railway	Following station
Zhuzhong Terminus	Liujia line	Terminus
Location

Liujia (traditional Chinese: 六家車站; simplified Chinese: 六家车站; pinyin: Liùjiā Chēzhàn) is a railway station on Taiwan Railway Liujia line located in Zhubei City, Hsinchu County, Taiwan.

Transfers to THSR Hsinchu station can be made at this station.

== History ==
The station was opened on 11 November 2011.

== Around the station ==
- Hsinchu HSR station

== See also ==
- List of railway stations in Taiwan
