= Rueylong Museum =

Museum in Qionglin, Hsinchu County, Taiwan

- 瑞龍博物館
- Established: 1985
- Location: Qionglin, Hsinchu County, Taiwan
- Coordinates: 24°46′30″N 121°05′13″E
- Type: museum
- Public transit access: Shangyuan Station

The Rueylong Museum (traditional Chinese: 瑞龍博物館; simplified Chinese: 瑞龙博物馆; pinyin: Ruìlóng Bówùguǎn) is a natural history museum in Qionglin Township, Hsinchu County, Taiwan.

== Transportation ==
The museum is accessible within walking distance east from Shangyuan Station of the Taiwan Railway.

== See also ==
- List of museums in Taiwan
