= Zhubei railway station =

Railway station in Hsinchu, Taiwan

Zhubei Station 竹北車站
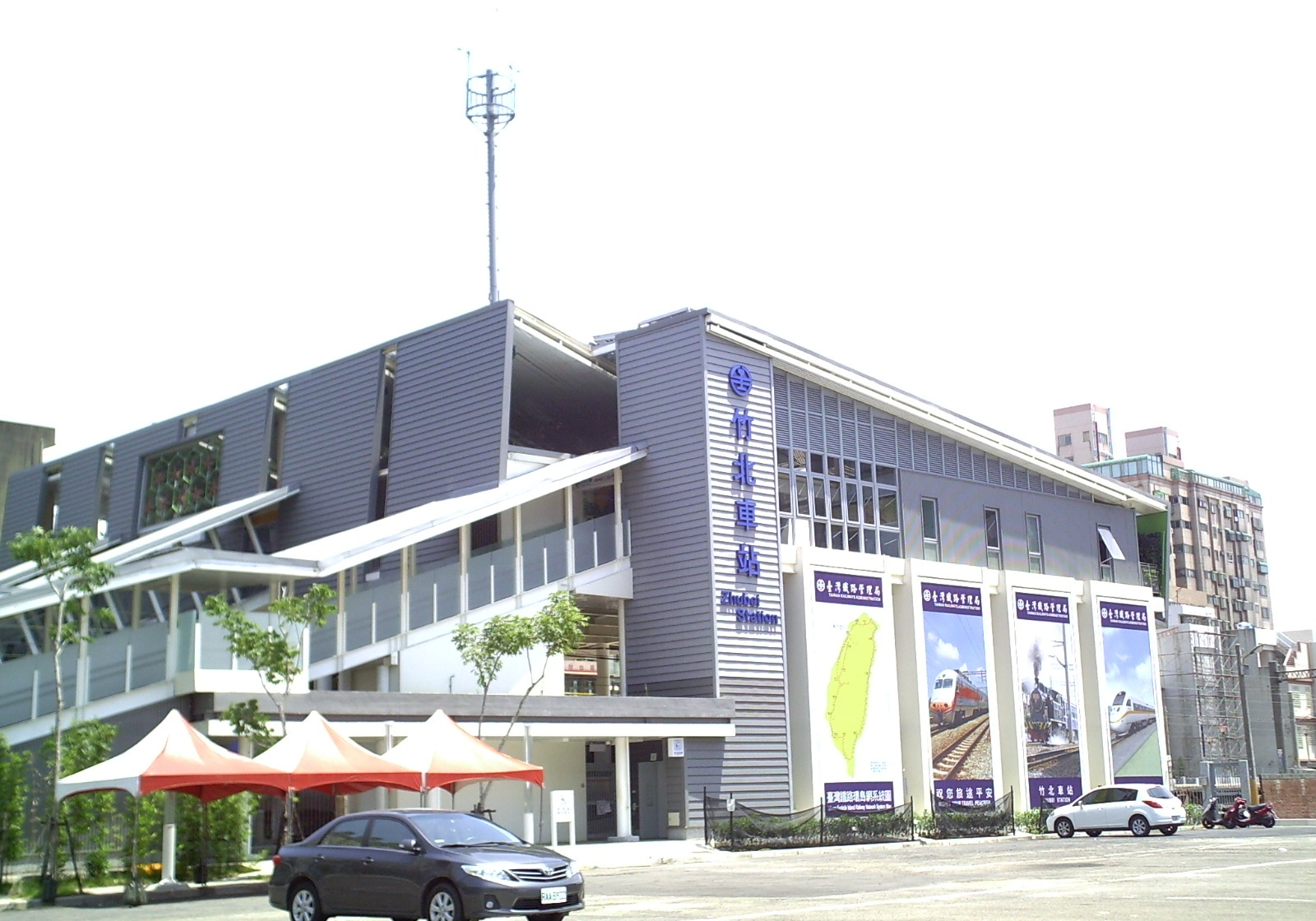
- Station entrance

Chinese name
- Traditional Chinese: 竹北車站
Transcriptions
Standard Mandarin
- Hanyu Pinyin: Zhúběi Chēzhàn
- Bopomofo: ㄓㄨˊ ㄅㄟˇ ㄔㄜ ㄓㄢˋ

General information
- Location: Zhubei, Hsinchu; Taiwan
- Coordinates: 24°50′20.7″N 121°00′32.8″E
- System: Taiwan Railway railway station
- Line: West Coast line
- Distance: 100.6 km to Keelung
- Platforms: 2 island platforms

Construction
- Structure type: At-grade

Other information
- Station code: 114

History
- Opened: 10 September 1897

Passengers
- 2017: 1,788,676 per year
- Rank: 37

Services
Preceding station	Taiwan Railway	Following station
Xinfeng towards Keelung	Western Trunk line	North Hsinchu towards Kaohsiung
Location

Zhubei railway station (Chinese: 竹北車站; pinyin: Zhúběi Chēzhàn) is a railway station located in Zhubei City, Hsinchu County, Taiwan. It is located on the West Coast line and is operated by Taiwan Railway.

== Around the station ==
- Hsinchu County Government
