= Hsinchu County Council =

Local council in Hsinchu County, Taiwan

Coordinates: 24.8257°N 121.0140°E

Hsinchu County Council 新竹縣議會

Type
- Type: County Council

Leadership
- Speaker: Chang Cheng-jung
- Deputy Speaker: Wang Ping-han

Structure
- Seats: 36
- Political groups: KMT (20); DPP (6); Labor (1); TPP (1); Independent (8)

Elections
- Voting system: Single non-transferable vote
- Last election: 2022

Meeting place
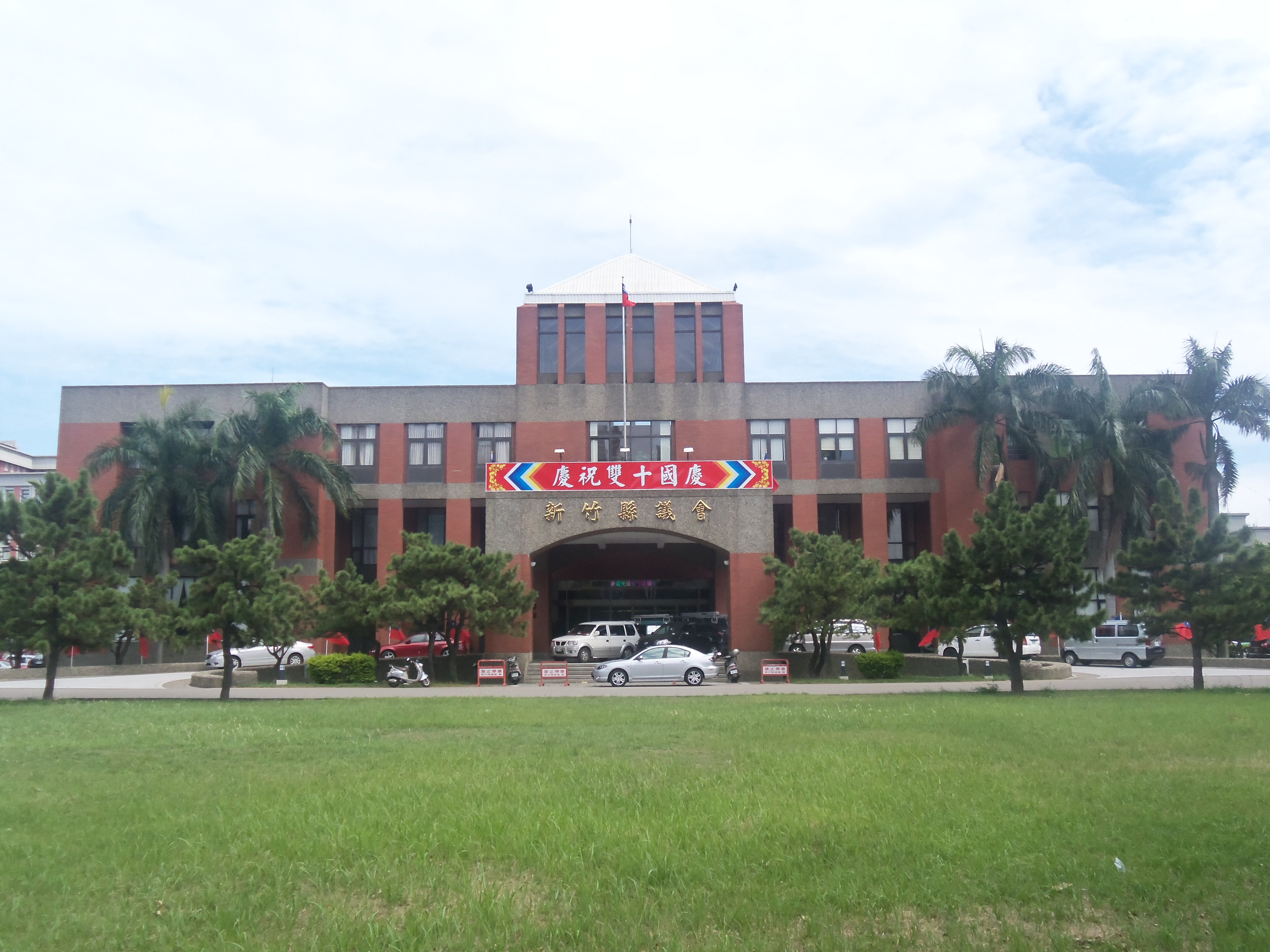
- The Building of Hsinchu County Council; Zhubei City, Hsinchu County, Taiwan

Website
- Official website

The Hsinchu County Council (HCC; traditional Chinese: 新竹縣議會; simplified Chinese: 新竹县议会; pinyin: Xīnzhú Xiàn Yìhuì) is the elected county council of Hsinchu County, Republic of China. The council composes of 35 councilors lastly elected through the 2022 Republic of China local election in 2022.

== History ==
The council was originally established on 14 April 1946 in Taoyuan at Wudedian Hall. It was then soon dissolved on 23 January 1951. The first members of the council was elected on 7 January 1951 and was shown on 23 January 1951. The temporary office for the council was at the east room of the Hsinchu County Government building (the present-day Hsinchu City Hall). On 28 October 1989, the county council moved from Hsinchu City to Zhubei City in Hsinchu County.

=== The 18th county council ===
Since the local elections in 2014, the Council was composed as follows:

Composition of Hsinchu City Council
Party Groups	Seats
Kuomintang ("Chinese Nationalist Party")	20
Democratic Progressive Party; Mínzhǔ Jìnbù Dǎng	3
Minkuotang ("Republican Party")	1
Labor Party; Láodòngdǎng	1
Green Party Taiwan; Táiwān Lǜ Dǎng	1
Independent	8
Total	34

== Current composition ==
Since the local elections in 2022, the Council was composed as follows:

Composition of Hsinchu City Council
Party Groups	Seats
Kuomintang ("Chinese Nationalist Party")	20
Democratic Progressive Party; Mínzhǔ Jìnbù Dǎng	6
Labor Party; Láodòngdǎng	1
Taiwan People's Party	1
Independent	9
Total	36

== Organization ==
=== Administration ===
- Personnel Room
- Accounting Room
- Legal Affairs Room
- General Affairs Room
- Council Session Room
- Secretary

=== Reviewing board ===
- First Review Meeting
- Second Review Meeting
- Third Review Meeting
- Fourth Review Meeting
- Fifth Review Meeting
- Procedural Committee
- Disciplinary Committee
- Joint Review Board
- Task Force

== See also ==
- Hsinchu County Government
