= Shangyuan railway station =

Railway station located in Hsinchu County, Taiwan

Shangyuan Station 上員車站
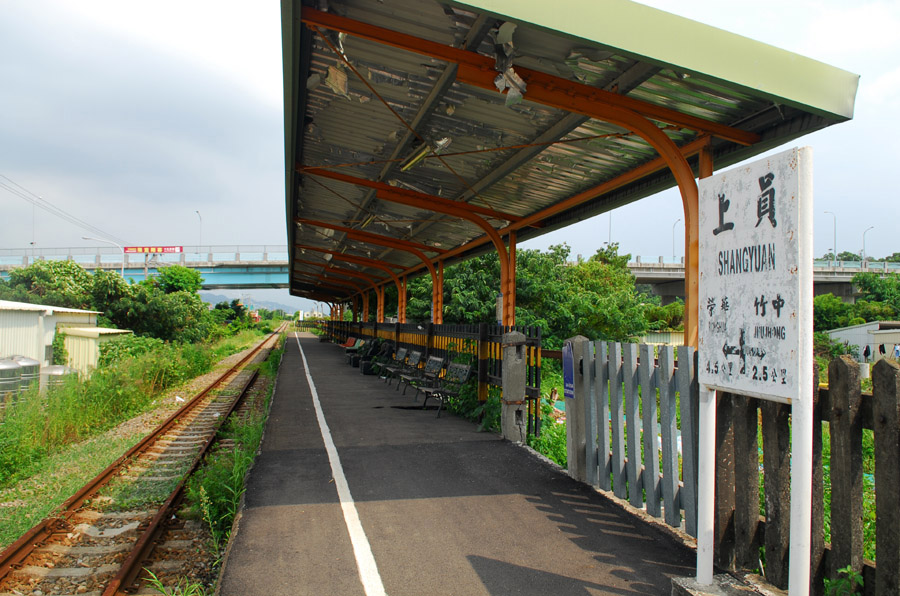
- Station platform

Chinese name
- Traditional Chinese: 上員車站
Transcriptions
Standard Mandarin
- Hanyu Pinyin: Shàngyuán Chēzhàn
- Bopomofo: ㄕㄤˋ ㄩㄢˊ ㄔㄜ ㄓㄢˋ

General information
- Location: Zhudong, Hsinchu County, Taiwan
- Coordinates: 24°46′40.3″N 121°03′20.6″E
- System: Taiwan Railway railway station
- Line: Neiwan line
- Distance: 10.5 km to Hsinchu
- Platforms: 1 side platform

Construction
- Structure type: At-grade

Other information
- Station code: 242

History
- Opened: 6 February 1970

Passengers
- 2017: 21,997 per year
- Rank: 189

Services
Preceding station	Taiwan Railway	Following station
Zhuzhong towards Hsinchu	Neiwan line	Ronghua towards Neiwan
Location

Shangyuan railway station (Chinese: 上員車站; pinyin: Shàngyuán Chēzhàn) is a railway station located in Zhudong Township, Hsinchu County, Taiwan. It is located on the Neiwan line and is operated by the Taiwan Railway.

== Around the station ==
- Rueylong Museum
