= Qionglin =

Rural township in Hsinchu County, Taiwan

Qionglin Township 芎林鄉
- Rural township
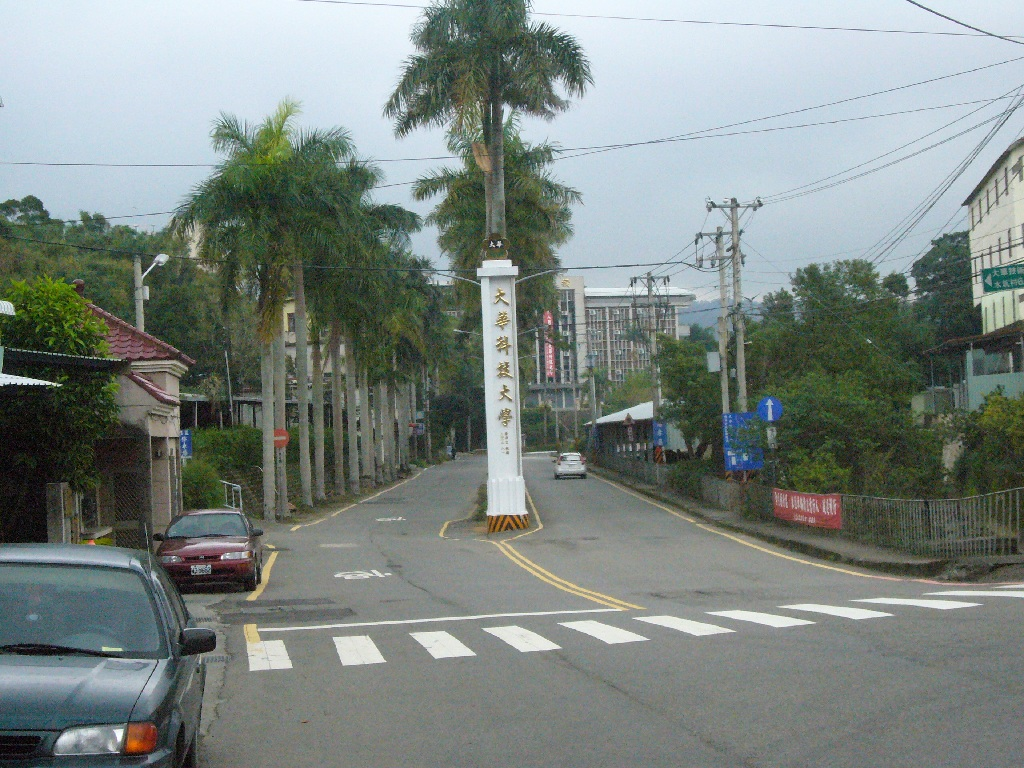

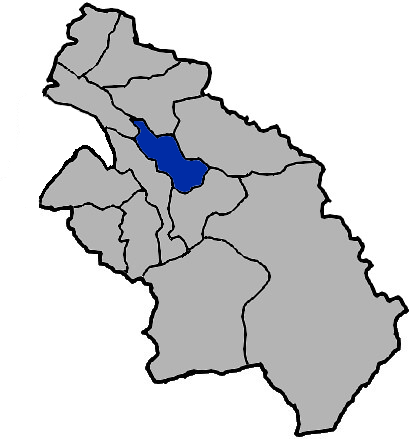
- Qionglin Township in Hsinchu County

- Location within Taiwan
- Location: Hsinchu County, Taiwan

Area
  - Total: 41 km^{2} (16 sq mi)

Population (March 2023)
  - Total: 20,224
  - Density: 490/km^{2} (1,300/sq mi)
- Website: qionglin.hsinchu.gov.tw/Default.aspx (in Chinese)

Qionglin Township
- Chinese: 芎林鄉
- Hanyu Pinyin: Qiōnglín Xiāng
- Wade–Giles: Ch'iung^{1}-lin^{2} Hsiang^{1}
- Pha̍k-fa-sṳ: Khiûng-lìm-hiông
- Hokkien POJ: Khiông-nâ-hiong

Qionglin Township is a rural township in central Hsinchu County, Taiwan. Its population was estimated at 20,224 in March 2023.

== Administrative divisions ==
The township comprises 12 villages: Hualong, Qionglin, Shangshan, Shitan, Shuikeng, Wenlin, Wulong, Xiashan, Xinfeng, Xiuhu, Yongxing and Zhongkeng.

== Education ==
Ta Hwa University of Science and Technology is a private university located in Shuikeng Village. It is also the largest educational institution in Qionglin. It was founded in 1967, and was originally called Dahua Agricultural College focusing around farming. In 1969, it became an industrial college. In 1991, it was changed to a business school. In 1997, it became a technical college. Finally, in 2012 it took on its current name. The school has 3 schools of engineering, electricity, business and tourism management. It also has 13 departments and 1 research institute. Plus 5 schools of Hakka culture, glass creativity, innovation cultivation, green energy industry, disaster prevention research center, and 3 education centers of general education, sports, and language. In 2003, the school had a total of 331 faculty members and 8,731 students.

== Economy ==
Qionglin's economy is primarily focused around agriculture. The main crop used is rice, alongside fruits like citrus and pears, and other vegetables like tomatoes.

== Tourist attractions ==
- Deng Yu-Xian Music Memorial Park
- Mount Feifeng
- Rueylong Museum
- Wen-Lin Temple
