= Emei, Hsinchu =

Rural township in Hsinchu County, Taiwan

Coordinates: 24°40′44″N 121°0′0″E

Emei Township 峨眉鄉
- Rural township
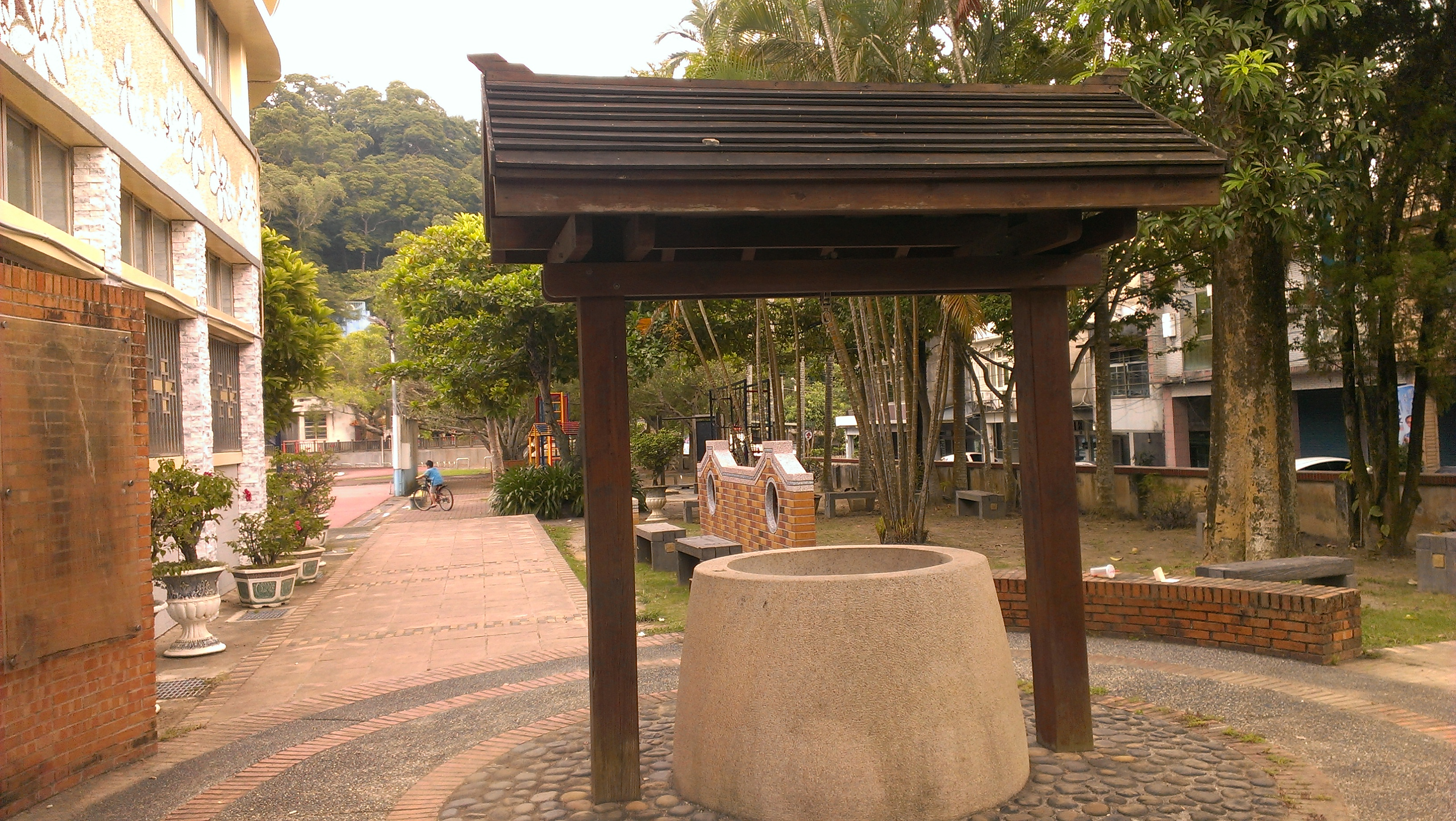

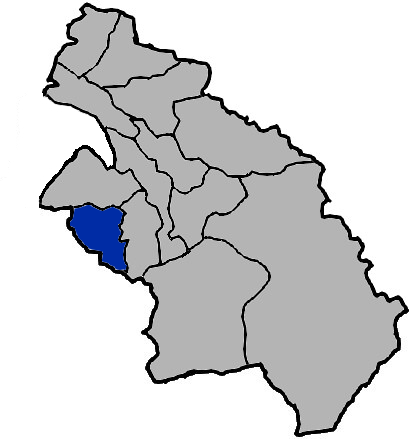
- Emei Township in Hsinchu County
- Location: Hsinchu County, Taiwan

Area
  - Total: 47 km^{2} (18 sq mi)

Population (February 2023)
  - Total: 5,312
  - Density: 110/km^{2} (290/sq mi)
- Website: emei.hsinchu.gov.tw/en

Emei Township (Chinese: 峨眉鄉; pinyin: Éméi Xiāng) is a rural township in Hsinchu County, Taiwan.

== History ==
Emei Township was originally named Goeh-bai (Chinese: 月眉; Pe̍h-ōe-jī: Goe̍h-bâi), taking the name from the curved crescent moon shape of the Emei Stream (峨眉溪). In 1904, during Japanese rule, the township was renamed to Gabi (峨眉), which is retained as the present Emei.

== Geography ==
- Area: 46.80 km^{2} (18.07 sq mi)
- Population: 5,312 (February 2023)

== Administrative divisions ==
- Emei Village
- Zhongcheng Village
- Shijing Village
- Qixing Village
- Fuxing Village
- Huguang Village

== Tourist attractions ==
- Emei Lake
- Erliao Divien Tree
- Fuxing Old Street
- Mount Shitou
- Qixing Camphor Tree
- Qixing Tree
- Shierliao Leisure Agricultural Region
- Xi Mao Bu Hanging Bridge

== Notable natives ==
- Chiu Ching-chun, Magistrate of Hsinchu County (2009–2018)
- Yang Wen-ke, Magistrate of Hsinchu County
