= Fengshan River =

River in Hsinchu County, Taiwan

Coordinates: 24.8528°N 120.9300°E

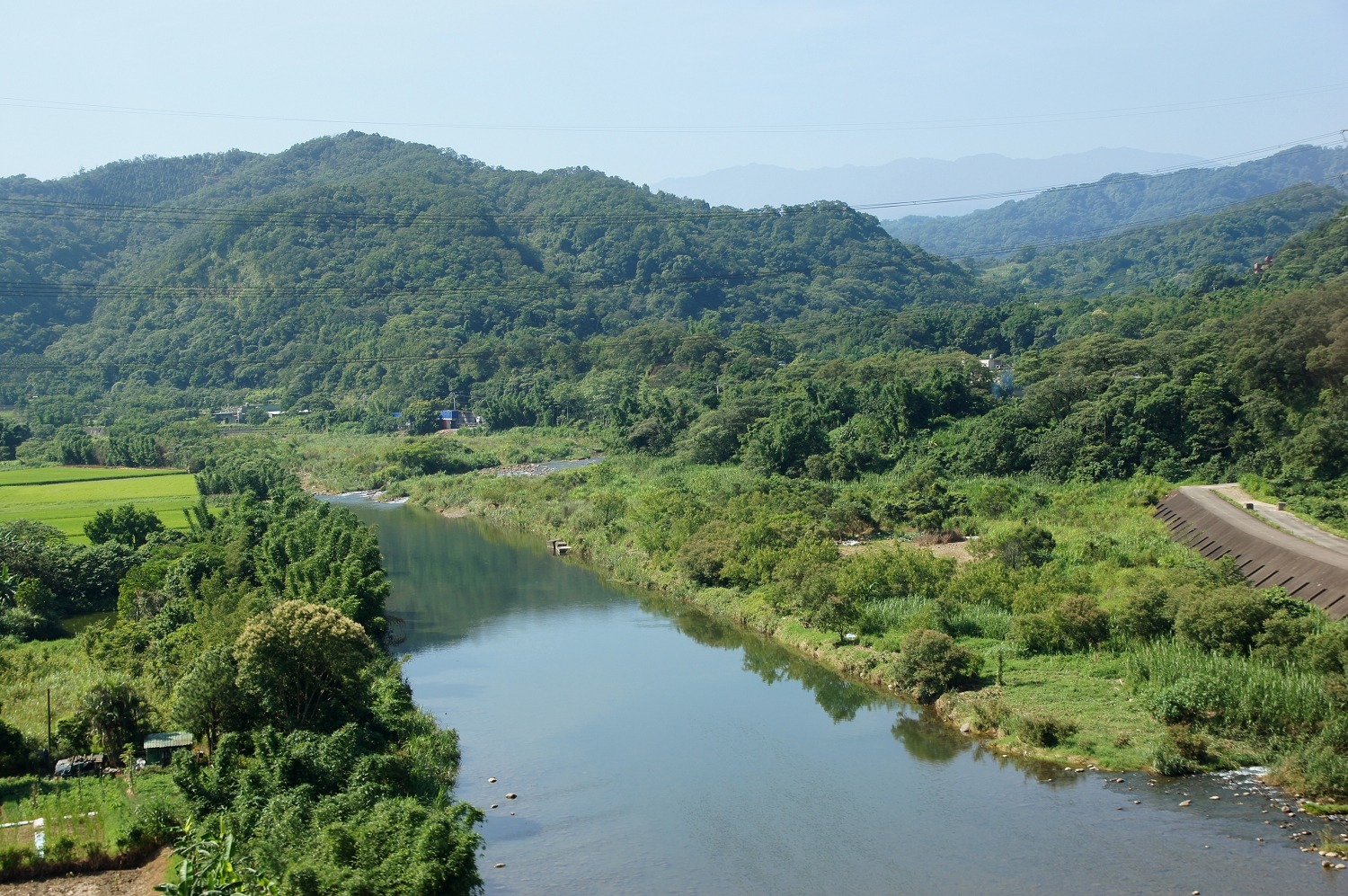
- Native name: 鳳山溪 (Chinese)

Location
- Country: Taiwan

Physical characteristics
- Source
  - location: Jianshi, Hsinchu: 結山
  - elevation: 1,320 m (4,330 ft)
- Mouth
  - location: Taiwan Strait: Hsinchu County
- Length: 45.45 km (28.24 mi)
- Basin size: 250.1 km^{2} (96.6 sq mi)

The Fengshan River (Chinese: 鳳山溪; Hanyu Pinyin: Fèngshān Xī; Tongyong Pinyin: Fòngshān Si) is a river in northern Taiwan. It flows through Hsinchu County for 45 km.

== See also ==
- List of rivers in Taiwan
