= Hsinchu County Government =

Government of Hsinchu County, Taiwan

Coordinates: 24.8269°N 121.0129°E

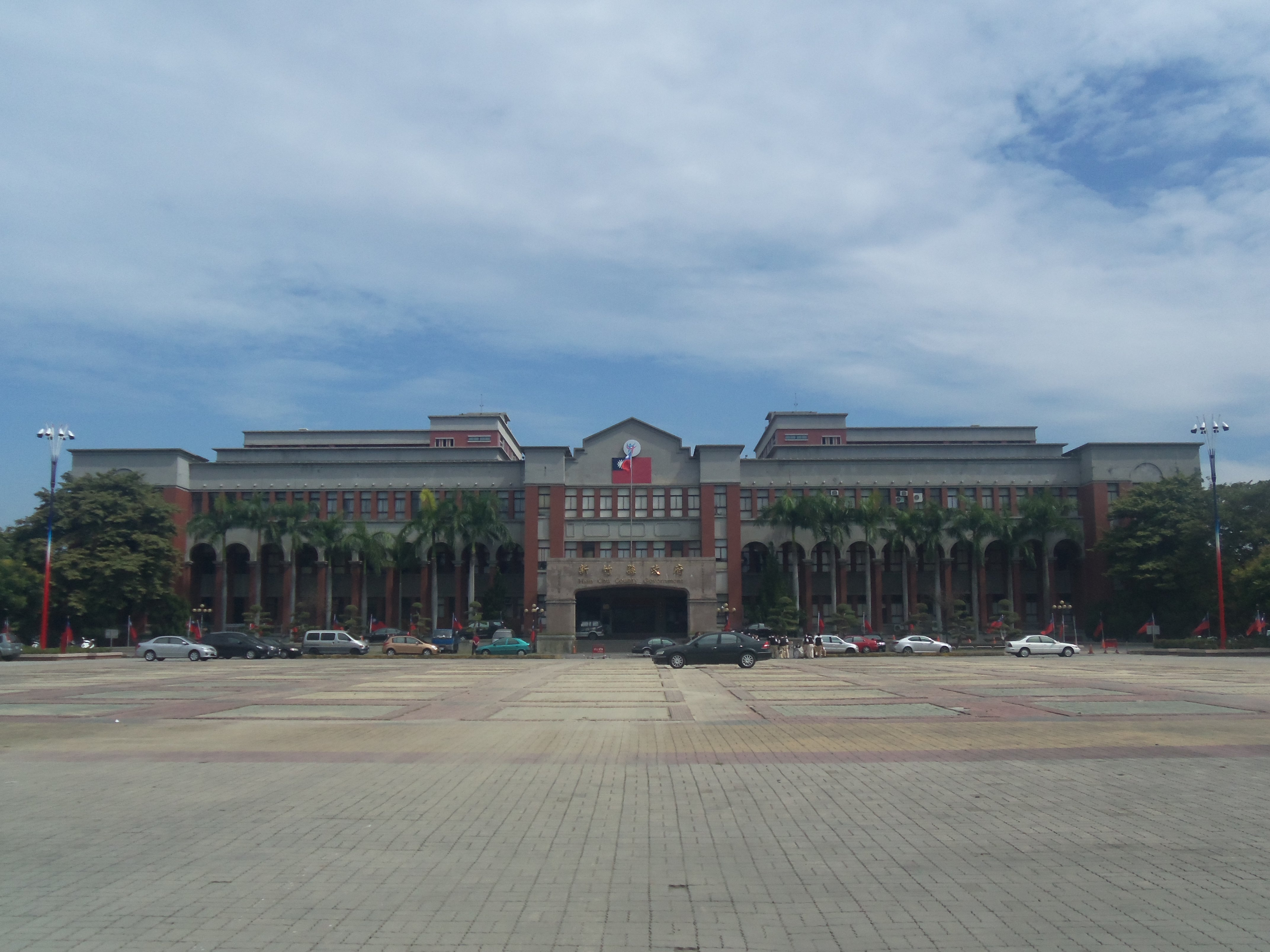
- Hsinchu County Hall

Agency overview
- Jurisdiction: Hsinchu County
- Headquarters: Zhubei City
- Agency executive: Yang Wen-ke, Magistrate
- Website: Official website

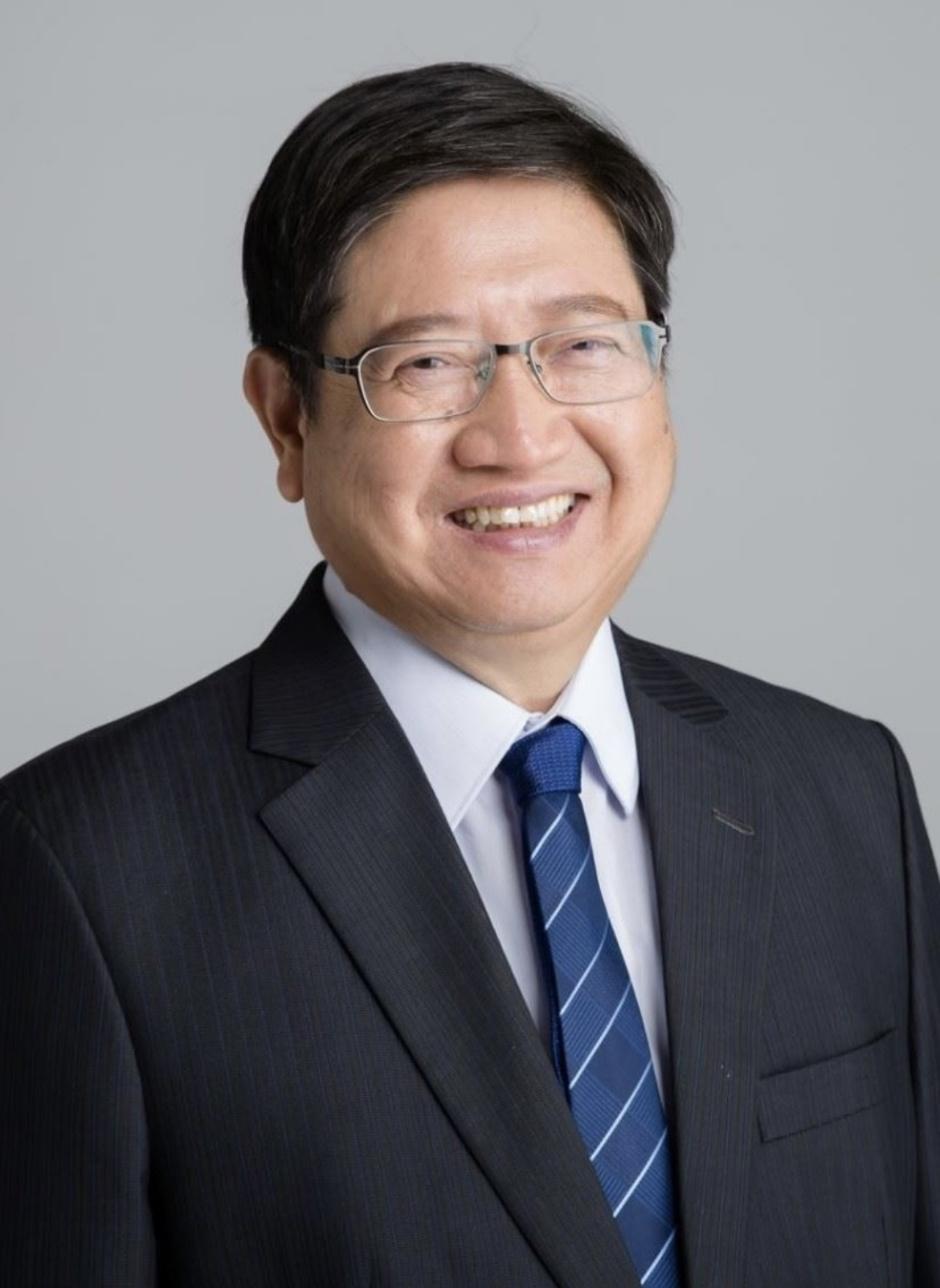
Yang Wen-ke, the incumbent Magistrate of Hsinchu County

The Hsinchu County Government (traditional Chinese: 新竹縣政府; simplified Chinese: 新竹县政府; pinyin: Xīnzhú Xiàn Zhèngfǔ) is the local government of Hsinchu County, Taiwan.

== Organization ==
- Civil Affairs Department
- Finance Department
- International Economic Development Department
- Public Works Department
- Education Department
- Agriculture Department
- Social Affairs Department
- Labor Affairs Department
- Land Administration Department
- Transportation and Tourism Department
- General Development Department
- Administration of Indigenous Peoples Affairs
- Personnel Department
- Civil Service Ethics Department
- Budget, Accounting and Statistics Department

== Transportation ==
The building is accessible within walking distance south of Zhubei Station of Taiwan Railway.

== See also ==
- Hsinchu County Council
