= Zhubei =

County-administered city in Hsinchu County, Taiwan

Coordinates: 24°50′00″N 121°00′43″E

Zhubei 竹北市 Chikuhoku, Chupei, Jhubei
- County-administered city
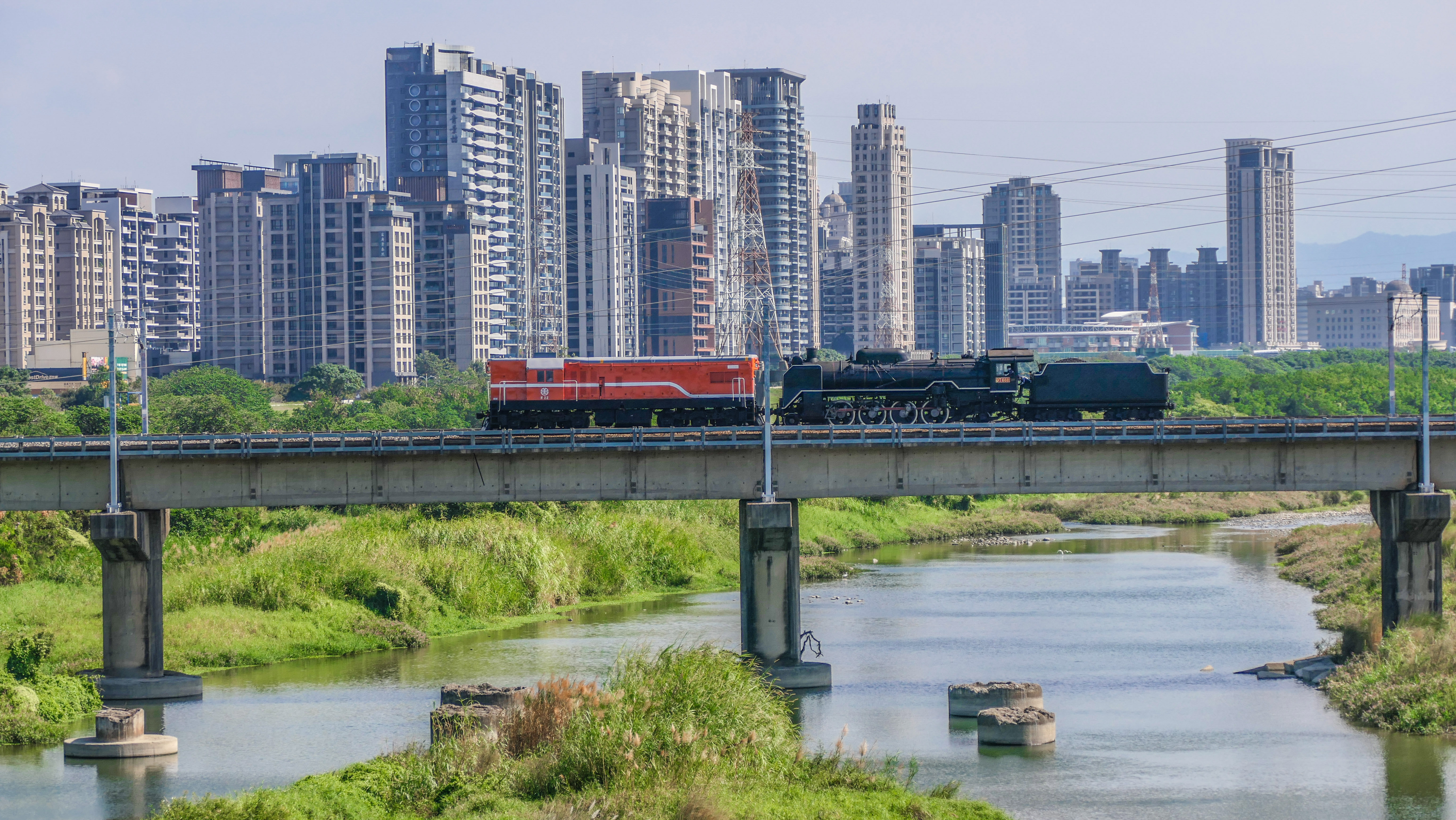
- Skyline of Zhubei

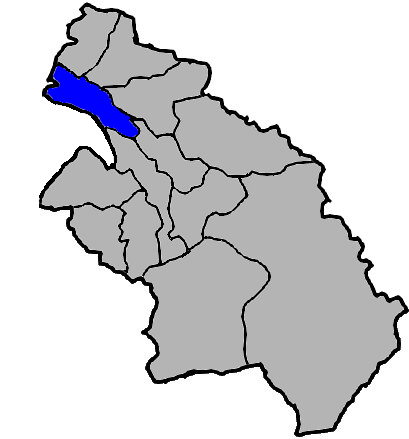
- Country: Republic of China (Taiwan)
- County: Hsinchu

Government
  - Mayor: Ho Kan-ming (Ind.)

Area
  - Total: 46.83 km^{2} (18.08 sq mi)

Population (March 2023)
  - Total: 212,695
- Postal code: 302
- Area code: (0)3
- Website: www.zhubei.gov.tw (in Chinese)

Zhubei City
- Chinese: 竹北市
Transcriptions
Standard Mandarin
- Hanyu Pinyin: Zhúběi Shì
- Bopomofo: ㄓㄨˊ ㄅㄟˇ ㄕˋ
- Gwoyeu Romatzyh: Jwubeei Shyh
- Wade–Giles: Chu²-pei³ Shih⁴
- Tongyong Pinyin: Jhúběi Shìh
- MPS2: Júběi Shr̀
- IPA: [ʈʂǔ.pèɪ ʂɻ̩̂]
Hakka
- Pha̍k-fa-sṳ: Chuk-pet-sṳ
Yue: Cantonese
- Yale Romanization: jūk bāk síh
- Jyutping: zuk1 bak1 si5
Southern Min
- Hokkien POJ: Tek-pak-chhī
- Tâi-lô: Tik-pak-tshī

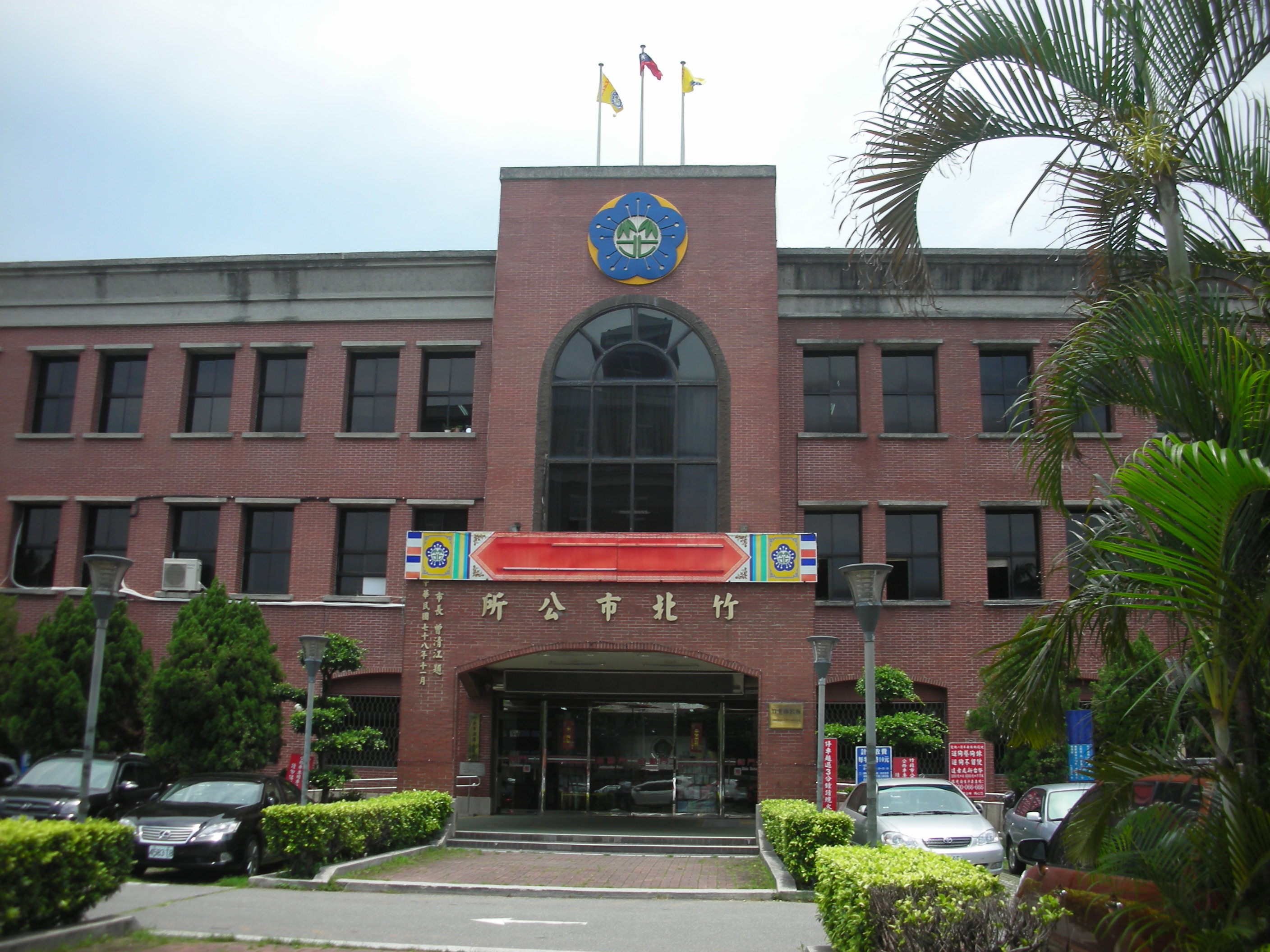
Zhubei City Office

Zhubei (Wade-Giles: Chupei; Hakka PFS: Chuk-pet; Hokkien POJ: Tek-pak) is a city in Hsinchu County, Taiwan. It is one of the country's fastest-growing settlements, with a population gain of 51,000 between 2010 and 2019, the highest of any township/city or district. The city has attracted migration both because of its proximity to Hsinchu City and the Hsinchu Science Park, and because the Hsinchu County government has focused most of its infrastructure here.

It is governed as a county-administered city, and is the county seat of Hsinchu County. Taiwan High Speed Rail's Hsinchu HSR station is located here.

== History ==
=== Empire of Japan ===
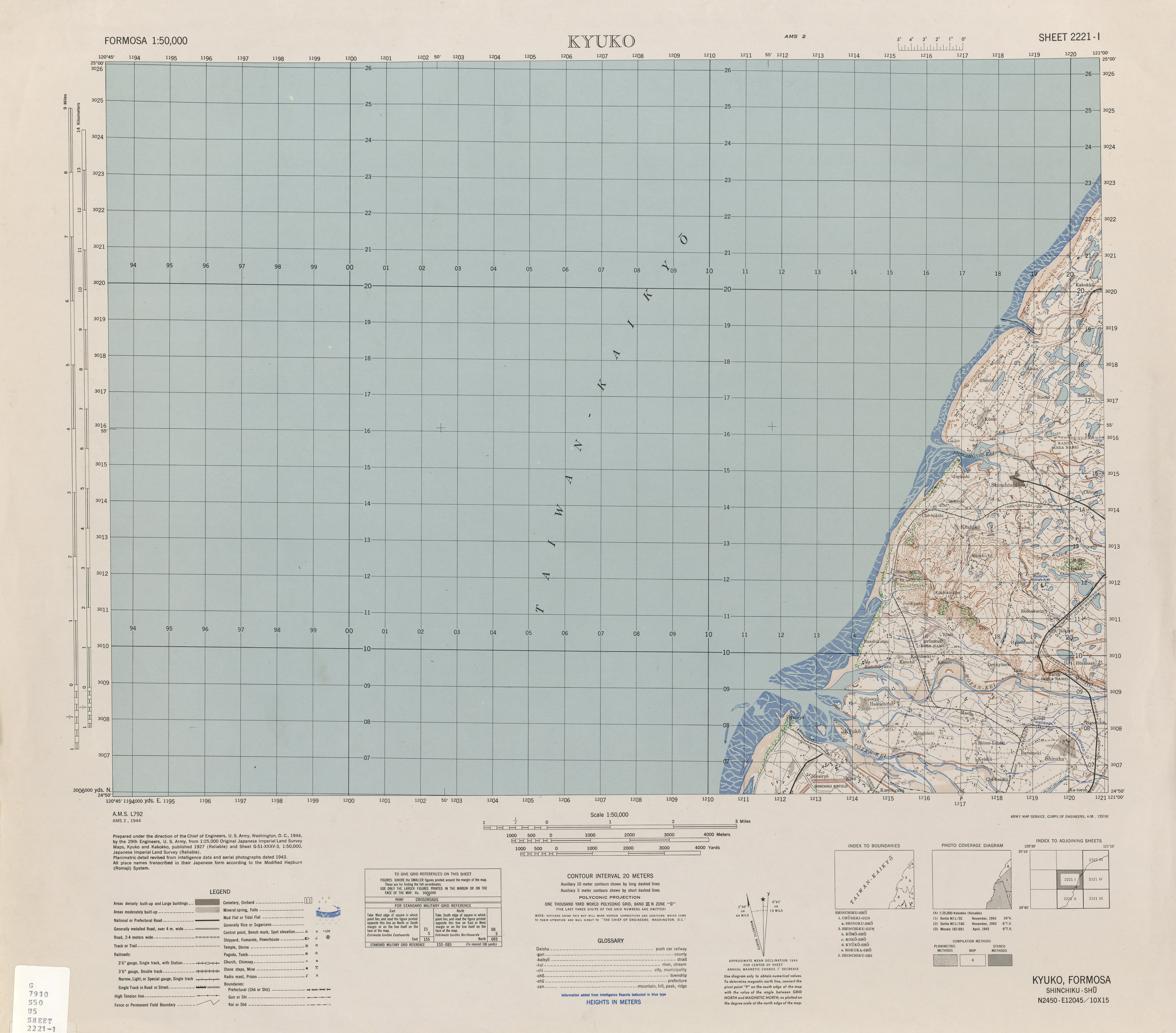
Map of Zhubei area (1944)

In 1920, the area of Chikuhoku Station (Japanese: 竹北驛) was formerly called "Angmo Field" (Chinese: 紅毛田; Pe̍h-ōe-jī: âng-mn̂g-chhân; lit. 'red fur field'). In 1941, Kyūminato Village (舊港庄) and Rokka Village (六家庄) merged to become Chikuhoku Village (竹北庄) under Shinchiku District, Shinchiku Prefecture.

=== Republic of China ===
Zhubei was originally a rural township under Hsinchu County from 1950 to 1988. In October 1988, Zhubei Township was promoted to a county-administered city.

== Geography ==
Zhubei borders Hsinchu City to the southwest, Xinfeng and Hukou Townships to the north, Qionglin and Xinpu to the East, Zhudong to the southeast, and the Taiwan Strait to its west. It is the discharge point of the Fongshan River and the Touqian River into the Taiwan Strait. Zhubei has been a satellite city of Hsinchu City since Hsinchu City reformed to become a special municipality in 1982. Due to the separation of Hsinchu City from Hsinchu County and Zhubei becoming the Hsinchu County seat, as well as its proximity to the Hsinchu Science and Technology Park and the semiconductor industry, the city has acquired an increasingly large amount of capital inflow from government, as well as a rapid population increase and a resulting spike in real estate values. The city's population was estimated at 211,746 in February 2023.

== Administrative divisions ==
The city is administered as 30 villages: Aikou, Baide, Beilun, Beixing, Chongyi, Damei, Dayi, Doulun, Fude, Lianxing, Luchang, Mayuan, Shangyi, Shixing, Taihe, Tunghai, Tungping, Tungxing, Wenhua, Xingan, Xingang, Xinguo, Xinlun, Xinshe, Xinzhuang, Xizhou, Zhongxing, Zhubei, Zhuren and Zhuyi.

== Government institutions ==
- Hsinchu County Government
- Hsinchu County Council

== Economy ==
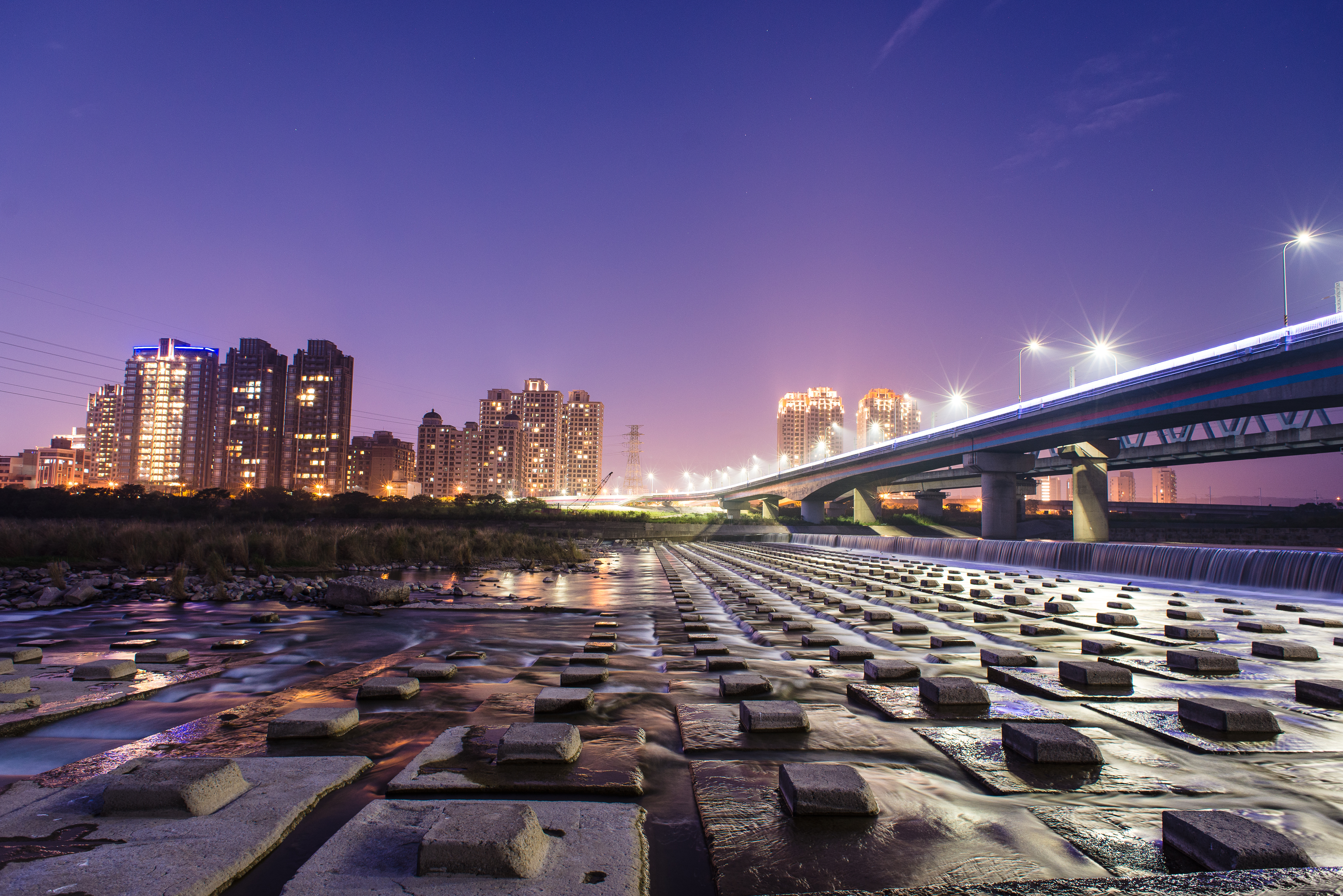
Skyscrapers of Zhubei viewed at night

The agricultural aspect of Zhubei has shifted from mainly rice paddy farming to more floral and fruit cultivation that attracts tourists; however the majority of the local economy is now fueled by the semiconductor industry, real estate speculation and the service sector. Parts of Zhubei City have retained their traditional infrastructure following the demolition of the old city. There are also industrial parks in the city, which are the Hsinchu Biomedical Science Park and the Tai Yuen Hi-Tech Industrial Park.

== Tourist attractions ==
- Cai-Tian-Fu-Di Nation
- Chinese Sweet Gum Avenue
- Coast Proterozoic Forest
- Feng-Qi Sunset Glow
- Hsinchu County Stadium
- New Moon Beach
- Red Forest Park
- Wen-Lin Hall
- Hsinwawu Hakka Culture Conservation Area
- Zhubei Nightmarket

== Education ==
- University
  - National Taiwan University of Zhubei (focuses mainly on institutional research).
  - National Yang Ming Chiao Tung University of Zhubei
  - National Taiwan University of Science and Technology of Zhubei (under construction).
- High school
  - National Zhu-Bei Senior High School
  - Yi Ming Senior High School

== Transportation ==
=== Rail ===
==== Taiwan Railways Administration ====
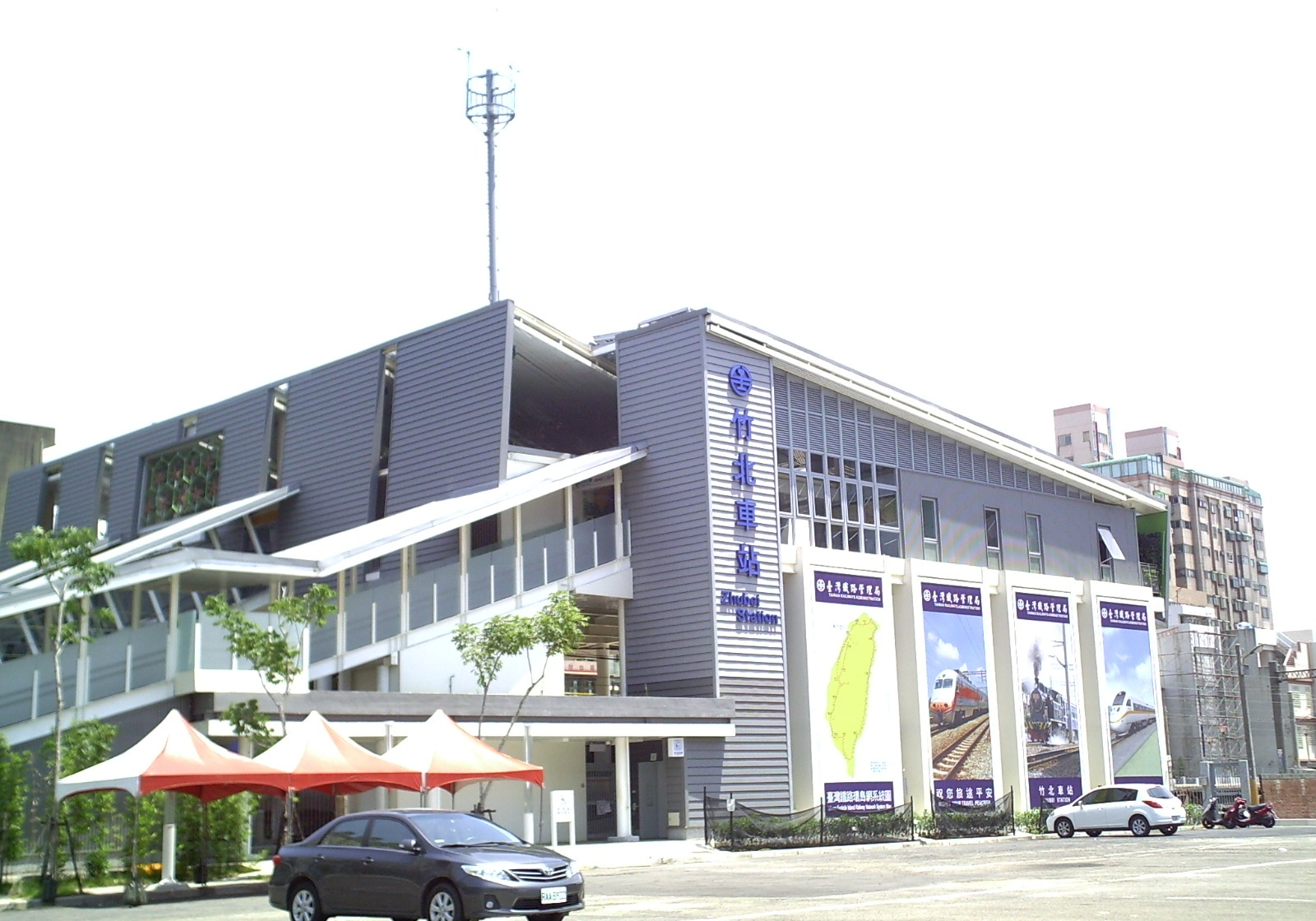
Zhubei railway station

Zhubei railway station is the main railway station in Zhubei City. In addition, there is also a Liujia railway station, which is transferrable to Hsinchu HSR station.

==== Taiwan High Speed Rail ====
Hsinchu HSR station is located in Zhubei, which is transferrable to Liujia railway station.

=== Highway ===
Zhubei is served by National Highway No. 1.
