= Hsinchu County =

County in Taiwan

Hsinchu County 新竹縣
- County
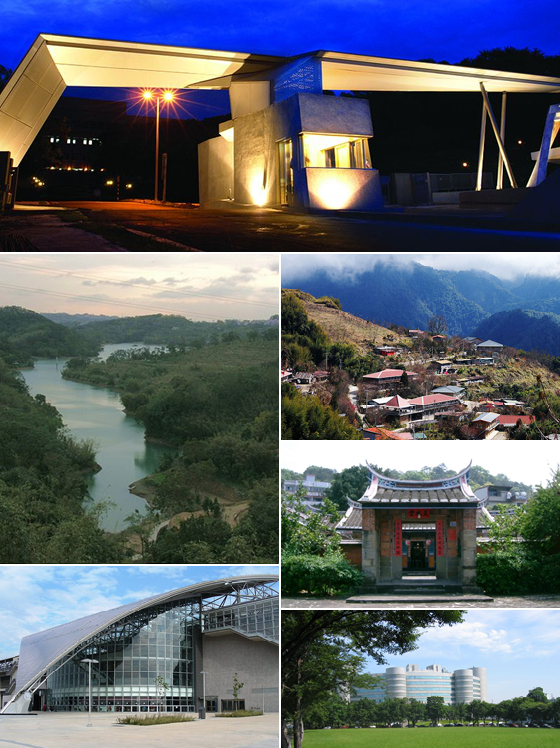

- Flag Logo

- Coordinates: 24°50′0″N 121°0′53″E
- Country: Taiwan
- Province: Taiwan (Note: In Taiwan, provinces remain a nominal division according to the Taiwanese constitution, but are no longer considered to have any administrative function practically.)
- Seat: Zhubei City
- Townships/cities: 13: Zhubei; Guanxi Township; Xinpu Township; Zhudong Township; Hukou Township; Hengshan Township; Xinfeng Township; Xionglin Township; Baoshan Township; Beipu Township; Emei Township; Jianshi Township; Wufeng Township

Government
  - Body: Hsinchu County Government; Hsinchu County Council
  - Magistrate: Yang Wen-ke (KMT)

Area
  - Total: 1,427.59 km^{2} (551.20 sq mi)
  - Rank: 12 of 22

Population (October 2023)
  - Total: 588,535
  - Rank: 10 of 22
  - Density: 412.258/km^{2} (1,067.74/sq mi)
- Time zone: UTC+8 (NST)
- ISO 3166 code: TW-HSQ
- Website: www.hsinchu.gov.tw/en/
- Symbols
- Bird: Muller's barbet (Megalaima oorti)
- Flower: Camellia
- Tree: Broad-leaved podocarpus (Nageia nagi)

Hsinchu County
- Traditional Chinese: 新竹縣
- Simplified Chinese: 新竹县
- Wade–Giles: Hsin¹-chu² Hsien⁴
- Hanyu Pinyin: Xīnzhú Xiàn
Transcriptions
Standard Mandarin
- Hanyu Pinyin: Xīnzhú Xiàn
- Bopomofo: ㄒㄧㄣㄓㄨˊㄒㄧㄢˋ
- Gwoyeu Romatzyh: Shinjwu Shiann
- Wade–Giles: Hsin¹-chu² Hsien⁴
- Tongyong Pinyin: Sinjhú Siàn
- Yale Romanization: Syīnjú Syàn
- MPS2: Shīnjú Shiàn
- IPA: [ɕín.ʈʂǔ ɕjɛ̂n]
Hakka
- Pha̍k-fa-sṳ: Sîn-chuk Yen
Southern Min
- Hokkien POJ: Sin-tek Koān
- Tâi-lô: Sin-tik Kuān

Hsinchu (Note: In local languages: Traditional Chinese script: 新竹縣; Mandarin Pinyin: Xīnzhú Xiàn; Hokkien: Sin-tik Kuān; Sixian Hakka: Sín-zùg Ien; Hailu Hakka: Sìn-zhug Rhǎn) is a county in north-western Taiwan. The population of the county is mainly Hakka; with a Taiwanese aboriginal minority in the southeastern part of the county. Zhubei is the county seat, where the government office and county office is located. A portion of the Hsinchu Science Park is located in Hsinchu County.

== History ==
=== Early history ===
Before the arrival of Han Chinese colonists the Hsinchu area was home to the indigenous Taokas, Saisiyat, and Atayal. After the Spanish occupied northern Taiwan, Catholic missionaries arrived at Tek-kham in 1626. Hoklos and Hakkas came and began to cultivate the land from the plains near the sea towards the river valleys and hills.

=== Hakka immigration ===
In 1684, Zhuluo County was established and more Han settled near Tek-kham. A Chinese city was established there in 1711 and renamed Hsinchu in 1875. It became part of Taipeh Prefecture. In the late 19th century, Hoklo people dominated the coastal plains, forcing the Saisiyat and Atayal tribes to move to areas around Jianshi and Wufeng, while the Hakka and Taokas settled together in the river valleys and hills.

=== Japanese occupation ===
During the Japanese occupation of Hsinchu became known as Shinchiku and, by 1920, its prefecture covered the areas of modern-day Hsinchu County and City, Miaoli, and Taoyuan.

=== Republic of China ===
Like the rest of the Taiwan, the county is part of the nominal Taiwan Province of the Republic of China (ROC), which s no longer has any administrative function practically. After the handover of Taiwan from Japan to the Republic of China in 1945, Hsinchu County was established on 25 December 1945. In August 1950, Miaoli and Taoyuan were taken out from the county area to form Miaoli County and Taoyuan County respectively. On 16 August 1950, Hsinchu City was incorporated to the county as county-administered city. However, the city was then upgraded again to become a provincial city on 1 July 1982 and was taken out from Hsinchu County area. The county's Xiangshan Township was incorporated into Hsinchu City on 1 July 1982. In 2021, plans are underway to have both Hsinchu county and city merged into the nation's seventh special municipality.

== Geography ==
Hsinchu County is located at the northwest part of Taiwan Island. The county borders Taoyuan City to the north, Miaoli County to the south, the Taiwan Strait to the west, and the Xueshan & Dabajian mountains to the east. With an area spanning up to 1,427.59 km^{2} (551.20 sq mi), Hsinchu County is composed mainly of uplands, tablelands, mountains, the alluvial plains of the Fengshan River and Touqian River mouth area, and some ancient river land.

=== Climate ===
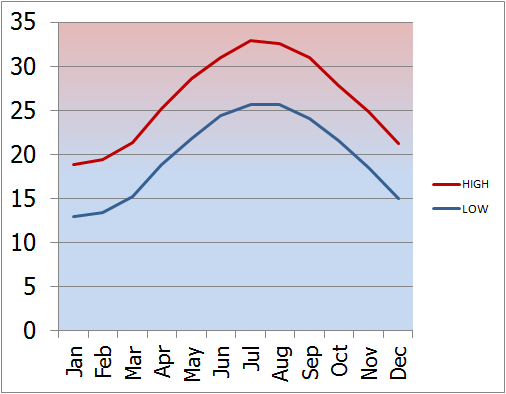
Average Temperature of Hsinchu

The average climate in Hsinchu County is mild.

== Administration ==
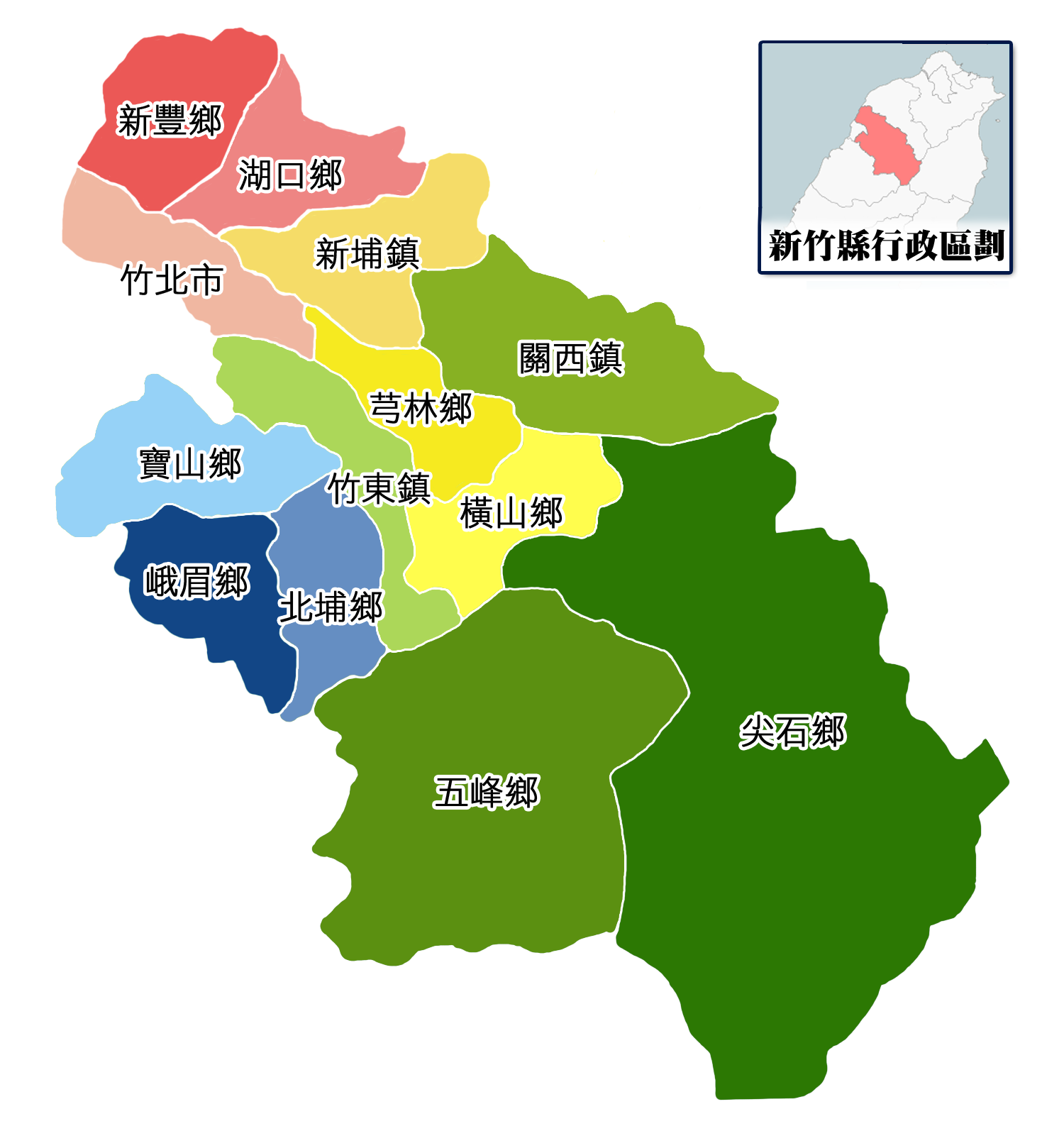
Administrative Divisions of Hsinchu County

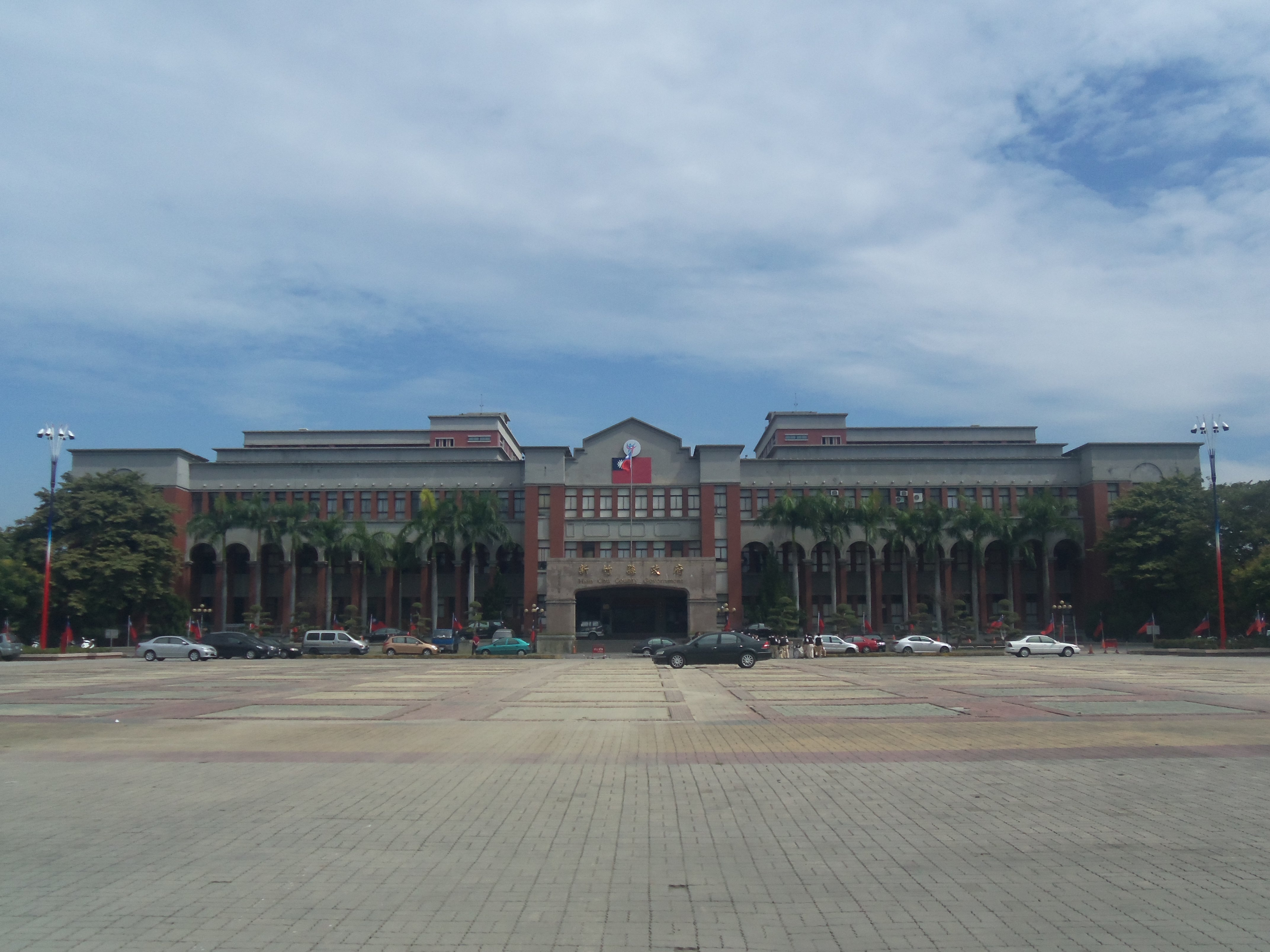
Hsinchu County Government

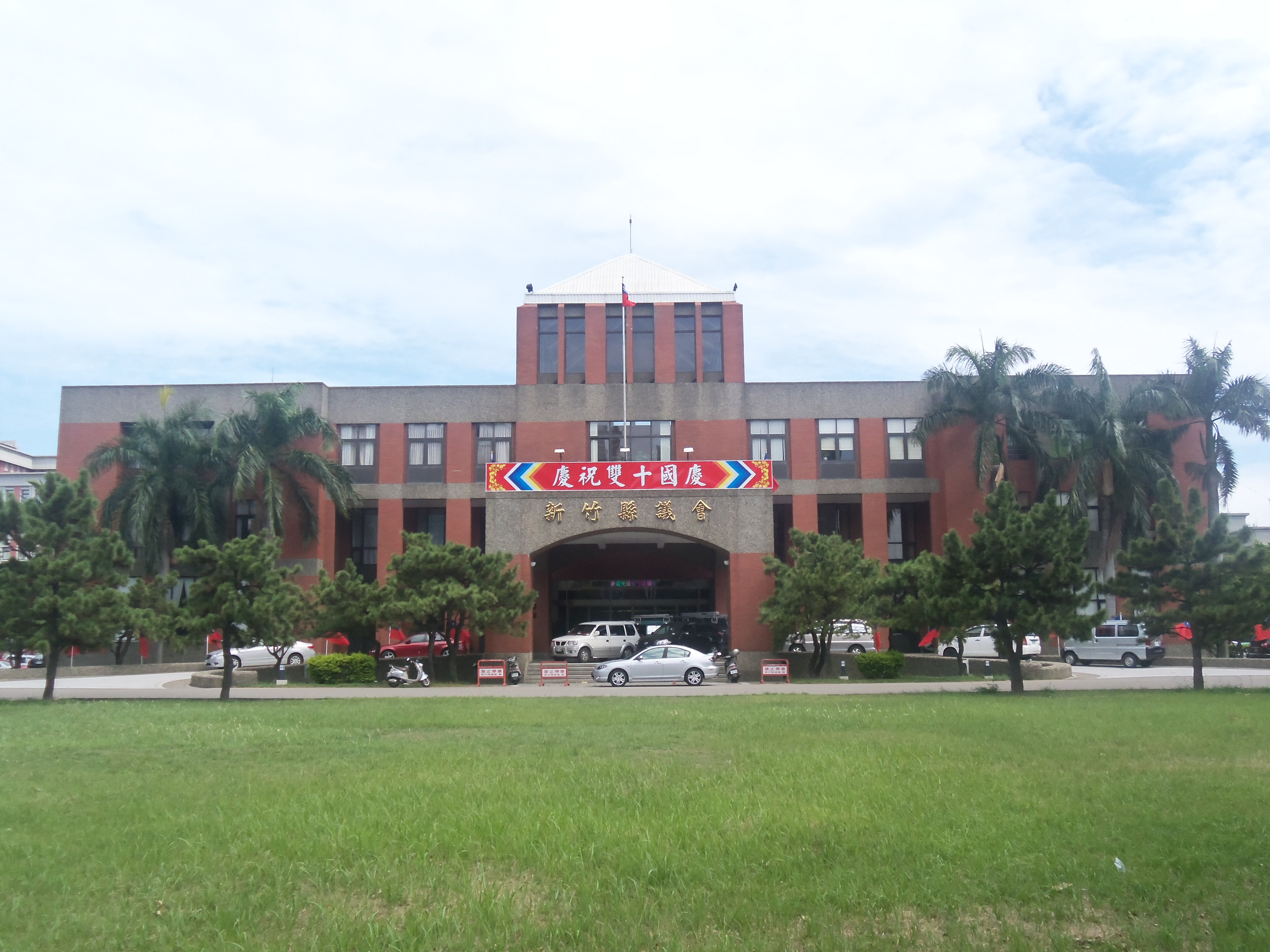
Hsinchu County Council

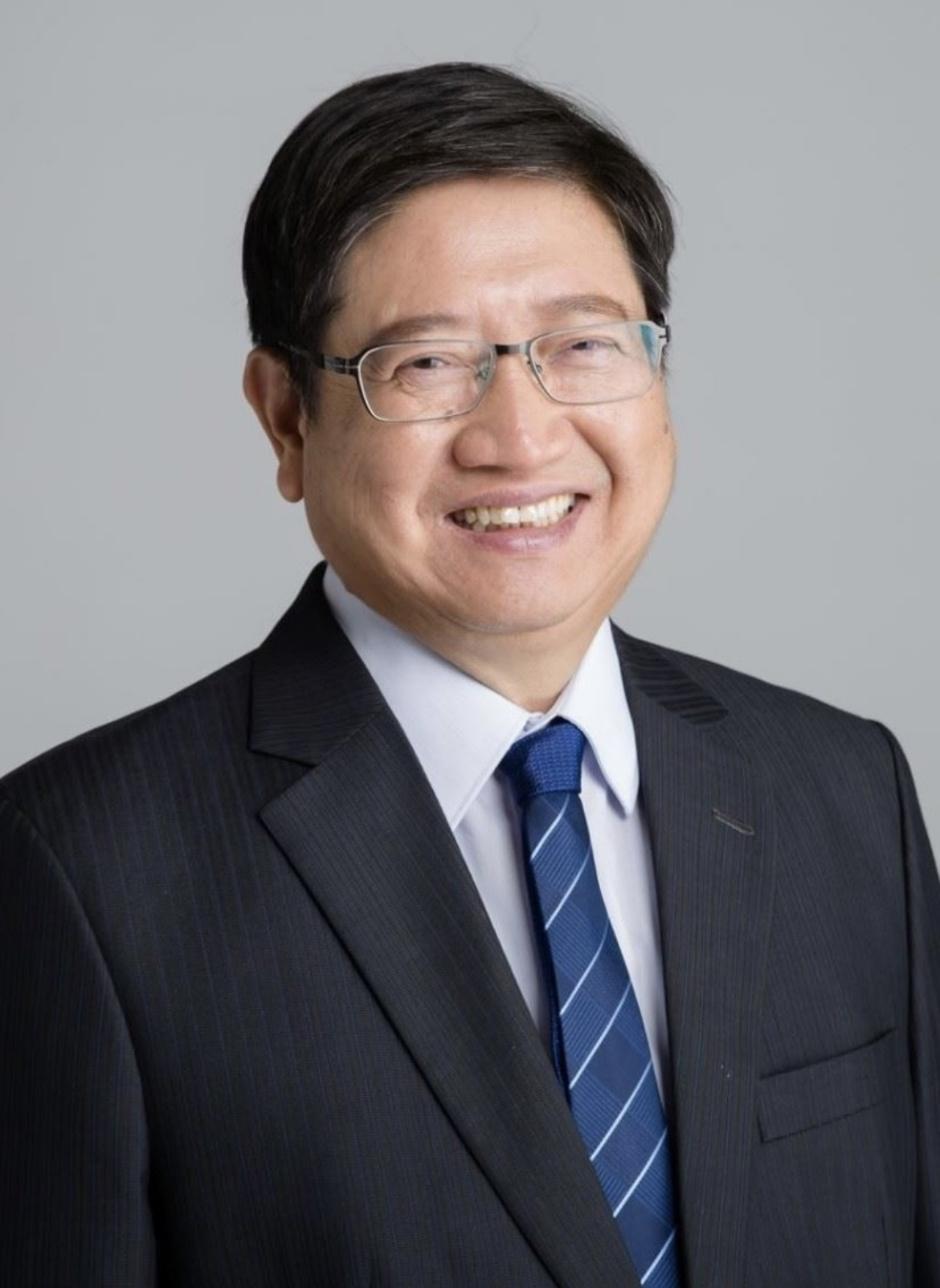
Yang Wen-ke, the incumbent Magistrate of Hsinchu County

Hsinchu County comprises 1 city, 3 urban townships, 6 rural townships and 2 mountain indigenous townships. Zhubei City is the county seat and the location of Hsinchu County Government and Hsinchu County Council. The incumbent Magistrate of Hsinchu County is Yang Wen-ke of the Kuomintang. The following table shows the administrative division of the county:

Type	Name	Chinese	Hokkien	Hakka	Formosan
City	Zhubei City	竹北市	Tek-pak	Tsuk-pet	
Urban townships (towns)	Guanxi	關西鎮	Koan-se	Kûan-sî	Kansai Atayal
Urban townships (towns)	Xinpu	新埔鎮	Sin-po͘	Sîn-phû	
Urban townships (towns)	Zhudong	竹東鎮	Tek-tang	Tsuk-tûng	
Rural townships	Baoshan	寶山鄉	Pó-san	Pó-sân	
Rural townships	Beipu	北埔鄉	Pak-po͘	Pet-phû	
Rural townships	Emei	峨眉鄉	Gô-bî	Ngô-mì	
Rural townships	Hengshan	橫山鄉	Hoâiⁿ-san	Vàng-sân	
Rural townships	Hukou	湖口鄉	Ô͘-kháu	Fù-khiéu	
Rural townships	Qionglin	芎林鄉	Khiông-nâ	Khiûng-lìm	
Rural townships	Xinfeng	新豐鄉	Sin-hong	Sîn-fûng	
Mountain indigenous townships	Jianshi	尖石鄉	Chiam-chio̍h	Tsiâm-sa̍k	Nahuy Atayal
Mountain indigenous townships	Wufeng	五峰鄉	Ngó͘-hong	Ńg-fûng	Gohogo Atayal, Saisiyat

Colors indicate the common language status of Hakka and Formosan languages within each division.

== Demographics ==
Historical population
Year	Pop.	±%
1946	281,109	—
1950	344,033	+22.4%
1955	397,276	+15.5%
1960	464,792	+17.0%
1965	525,008	+13.0%
1970	587,652	+11.9%
1975	617,311	+5.0%
1980	641,940	+4.0%
1985	366,566	−42.9%
1990	374,492	+2.2%
1995	408,577	+9.1%
2000	439,713	+7.6%
2005	487,692	+10.9%
2010	513,015	+5.2%
2015	542,042	+5.7%
2020	570,775	+5.3%
2025	597,235	+4.6%
Source: 1. "新竹縣現住人口籍別 (1946-1950)". 新竹縣統計要覽 (Report). Vol. 中華民國39年度(40.12). 新竹縣政府主計室. December 1951. p. 10.; 2. 周浩治 etc., ed. (October 2008). "第三章 民國四十一年至民國八十年時期 － 表三十五 光復後新竹縣各區歷年年底之人口數". 新竹縣志續修（民國四十一年至八十年）. Vol. 第二冊. pp. 71–72.; 3. "Populations by city and country in Taiwan". Ministry of the Interior Population Census.

The population of the county consists of Hakka, Hoklo, aborigines and new immigrants. The Hakka people constituted around 84% of the total population in 2014, while the aborigines consisted mainly of Atayal and Saisiyat people. As of October 2023, the total population was 588,535, with 288,912 females and 299,623 males.

View source data.

== Economy ==
=== High tech industry ===
After the founding of Hsinchu Science Park in 1980, a high number of high-tech industries began to grow and expand outside the park, attracting workers coming to work and settle in the county.

== Education ==
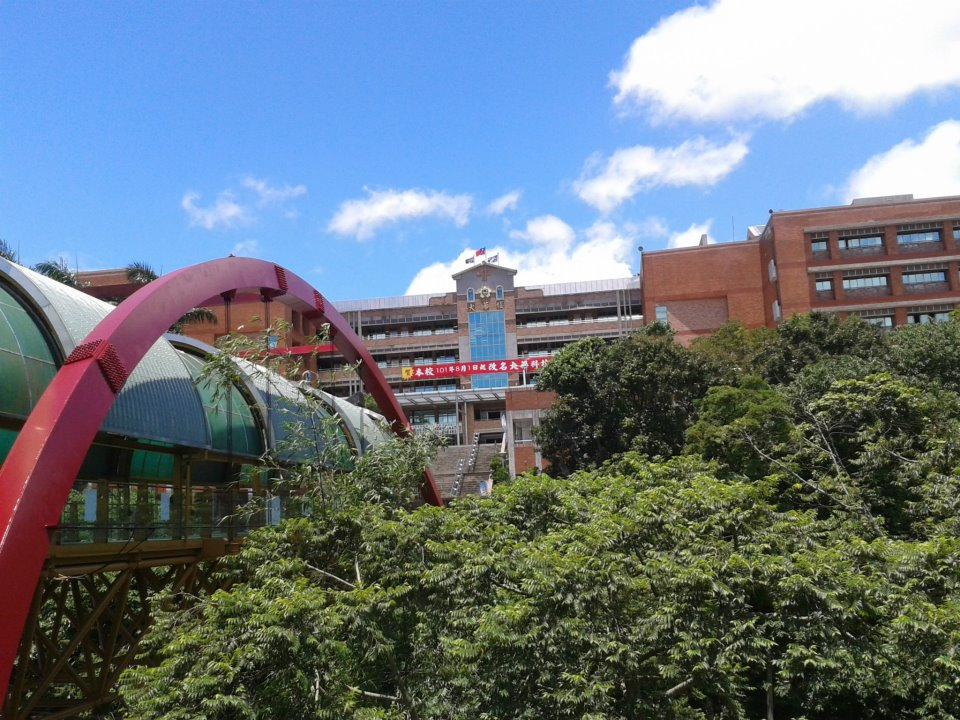
Ta Hwa University of Science and Technology

Education in Hsinchu County is administered by the Education Department of Hsinchu County Government. The county is home to the Minghsin University of Science and Technology and Ta Hwa University of Science and Technology.

== Energy ==
=== Power generations ===
Hsinchu County is home to the gas-fired Hsintao Power Plant with a capacity of 600 MW located in Guanxi Township.

=== Water supply ===
Hsinchu County houses the Baoshan Dam and Baoshan Second Dam.

== Tourist attractions ==
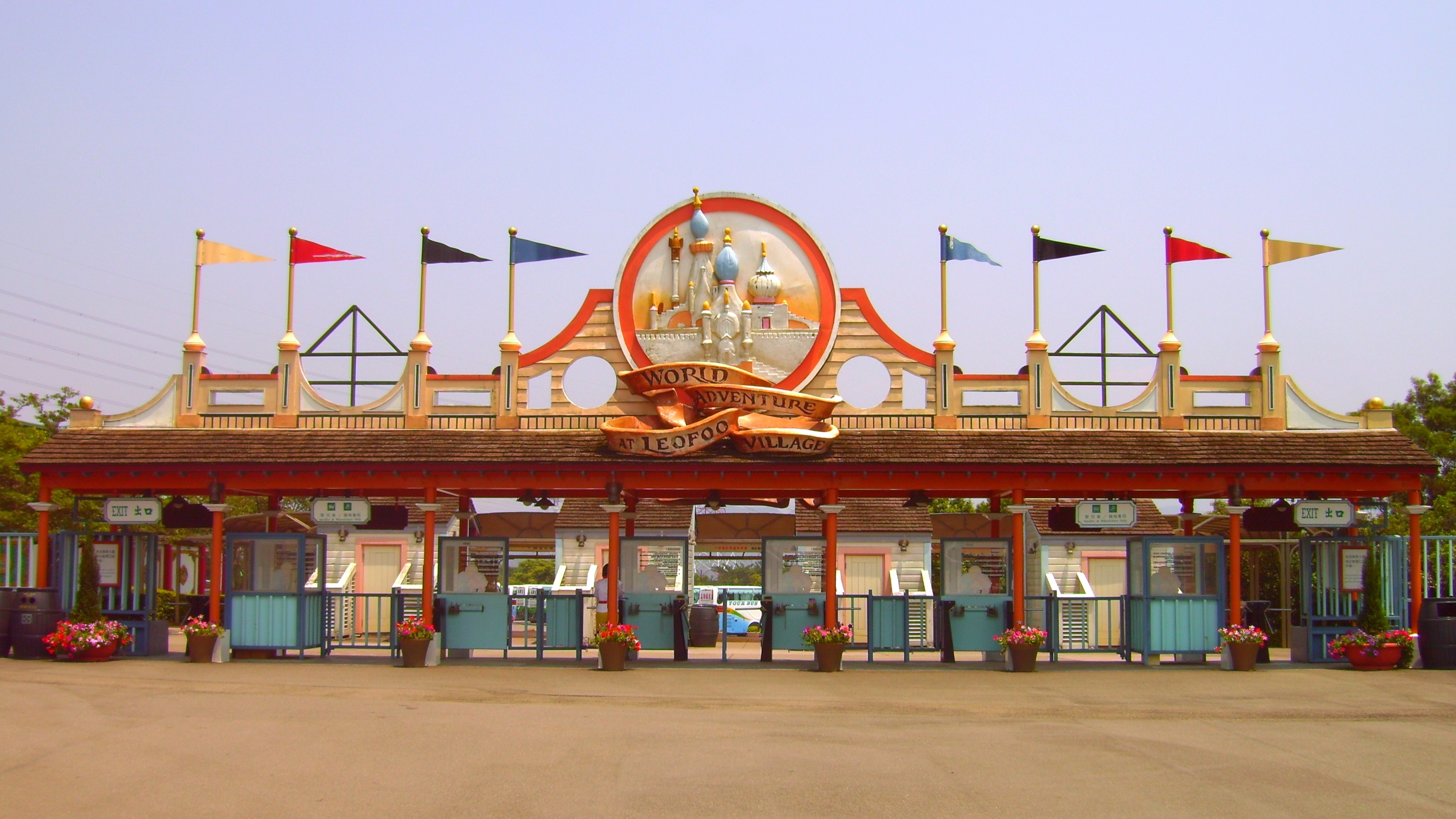
Leofoo Village Theme Park

- Beipu Citian Temple
- Mount Dabajian
- Former Residence of Zhang Xueliang
- Green World Ecological Farm
- Leofoo Village Theme Park
- Little Ding-Dong Science Theme Park
- Rueylong Museum
- Shei-Pa National Park
- Tapung Old Fort
- Zhudong Animation and Comic Creative Park
- Zhudong Timber Industry Exhibition Hall
- Beipu Old Street
- Neiwan Old Street
- Emei Huge Buddha Statue

== Sports ==
Hsinchu County has one professional basketball team, the Hsinchu JKO Lioneers of the P. League+.

== Transportation ==
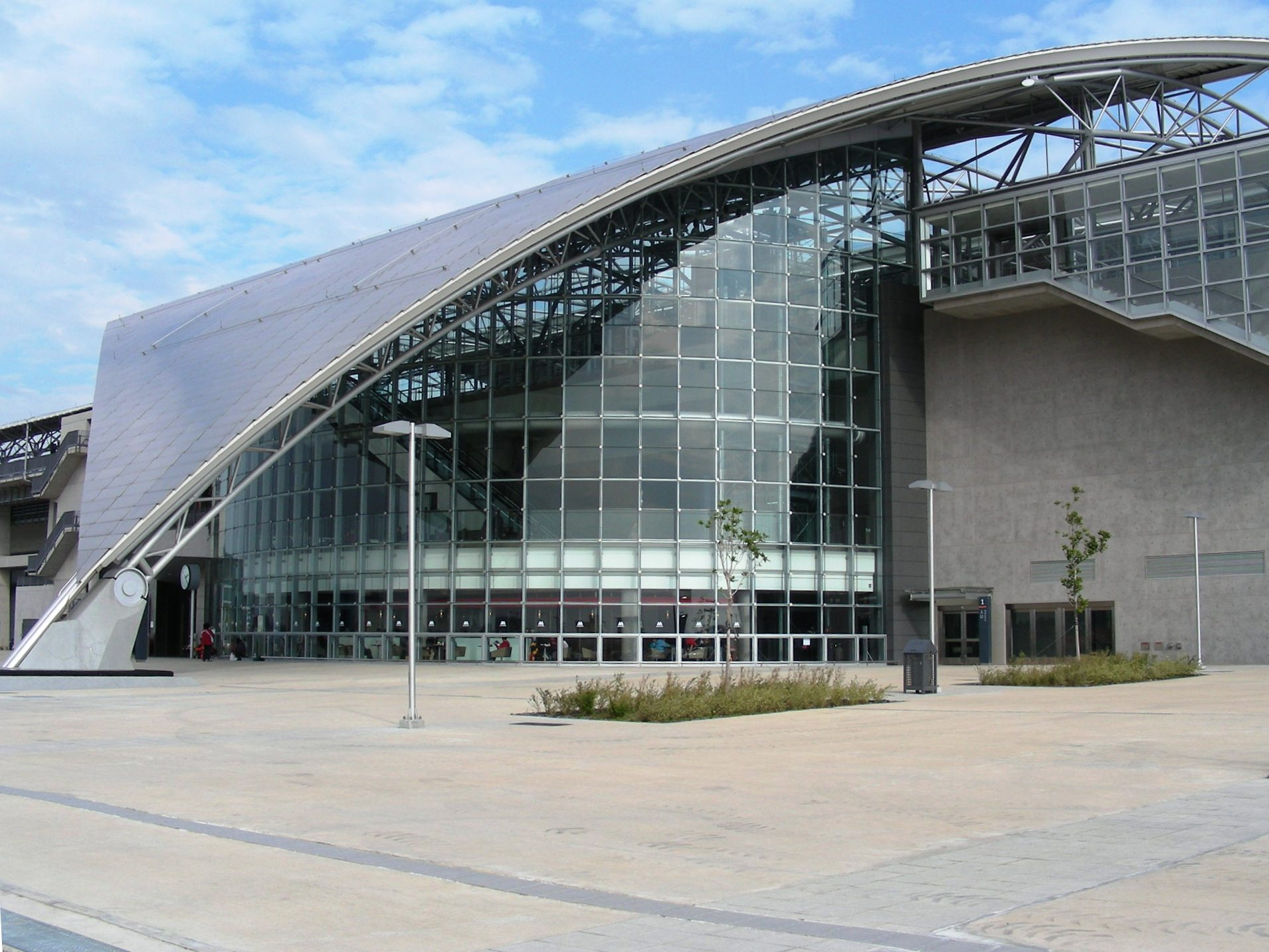
THSR Hsinchu Station

=== Rail ===
The Hsinchu Station of the Taiwan High Speed Rail is located in the county at Zhubei City. Hsinchu County is crossed by three Taiwan Railway lines, which are the Liujia Line, Neiwan Line and Western Line.

== Notable people ==
- Chen Ying-git, singer
- Cyndi Wang, singer-actress
- Hebe Tien, singer-actress and a member of girl group S.H.E
- Joanne Tseng, actress
- Joe Chen, actress
- Landy Wen, singer
- Miu Chu, singer

== International relations ==
=== Sister cities ===
- Miyazaki Prefecture, Japan
- Santa Clara, California, United States
- Westmont, Illinois, United States
- Ipswich, Queensland, Australia
