= Zhudong (disambiguation) =

Zhudong is an urban township in central Hsinchu County, Taiwan.

Zhudong may also refer to:

- Zhudong railway station, a railway station on the Taiwan Railways Administration Neiwan Line
- Zhudong Township (珠东乡), Pan County, Guizhou Province, China
- Zhudong Village (朱洞村), Taicheng Subdistrict, Taishan, Jiangmen, Guangdong Province, China
