= Lai Pi-hsia =

Taiwanese musician

- 賴碧霞
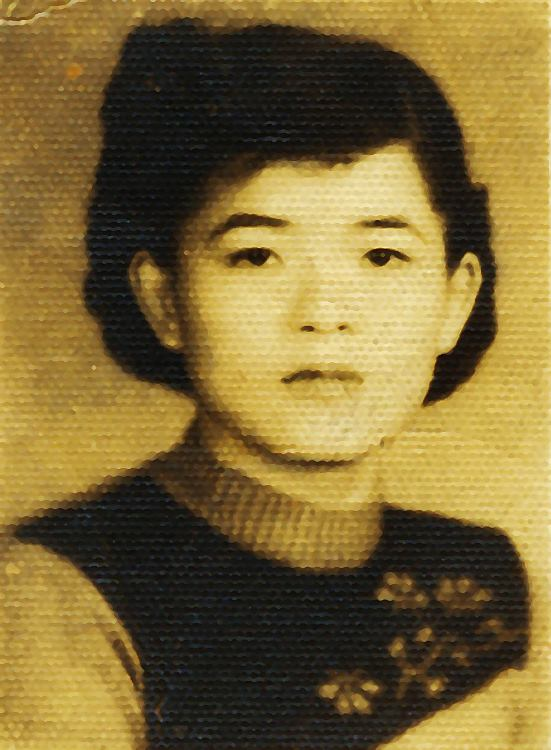
- Lai Pi-hsia (1950s)
- Born: 31 October 1932; Shinchiku, Taiwan, Empire of Japan
- Died: 18 January 2015 (aged 82); Zhongli, Taoyuan City, Taiwan
- Occupation: Musician
- Awards: 22nd Golden Melody Awards

Lai Pi-hsia (Chinese: 賴碧霞; pinyin: Lài Bìxiá; 31 October 1932 – 18 January 2015) was a Taiwanese musician known for performing Hakka hill songs.

== Background ==
Born in what became Zhudong, Hsinchu County, Lai was raised in Chingchuan, where she learned the Atayal language. After her father retired, the family returned to Zhudong. Lai, who had begun listening to her uncle's collection of Japanese music, heard her first Hakka hill song, and began lessons with folk musician Kuan Lo-cheng. However, Kuan was not a lyricist, so Lai Pi-hsia transcribed Hakka language lyrics from Lai Ting-han. By the age of 20, Lai Pi-hsia became a respected performer in her own right. She became a radio announcer in 1954, and soon starting writing her own music. Later, Lai wrote the screenplay for Tea Mountain Love Song, Taiwan's first Hakka-language feature film. She retired from performing in 1973 and focused on teaching and researching the art of Hakka hill songs. Lai founded an eponymous Hakka folk music troupe in 1993. She received the Jury Award at the 2011 Golden Melody Awards. Later that year, Lai was designated a national treasure.

== Death ==
Lai died aged 82 on 18 January 2015, at home in Zhongli.
