= Danny Wen =

Danny Wen 溫士凱
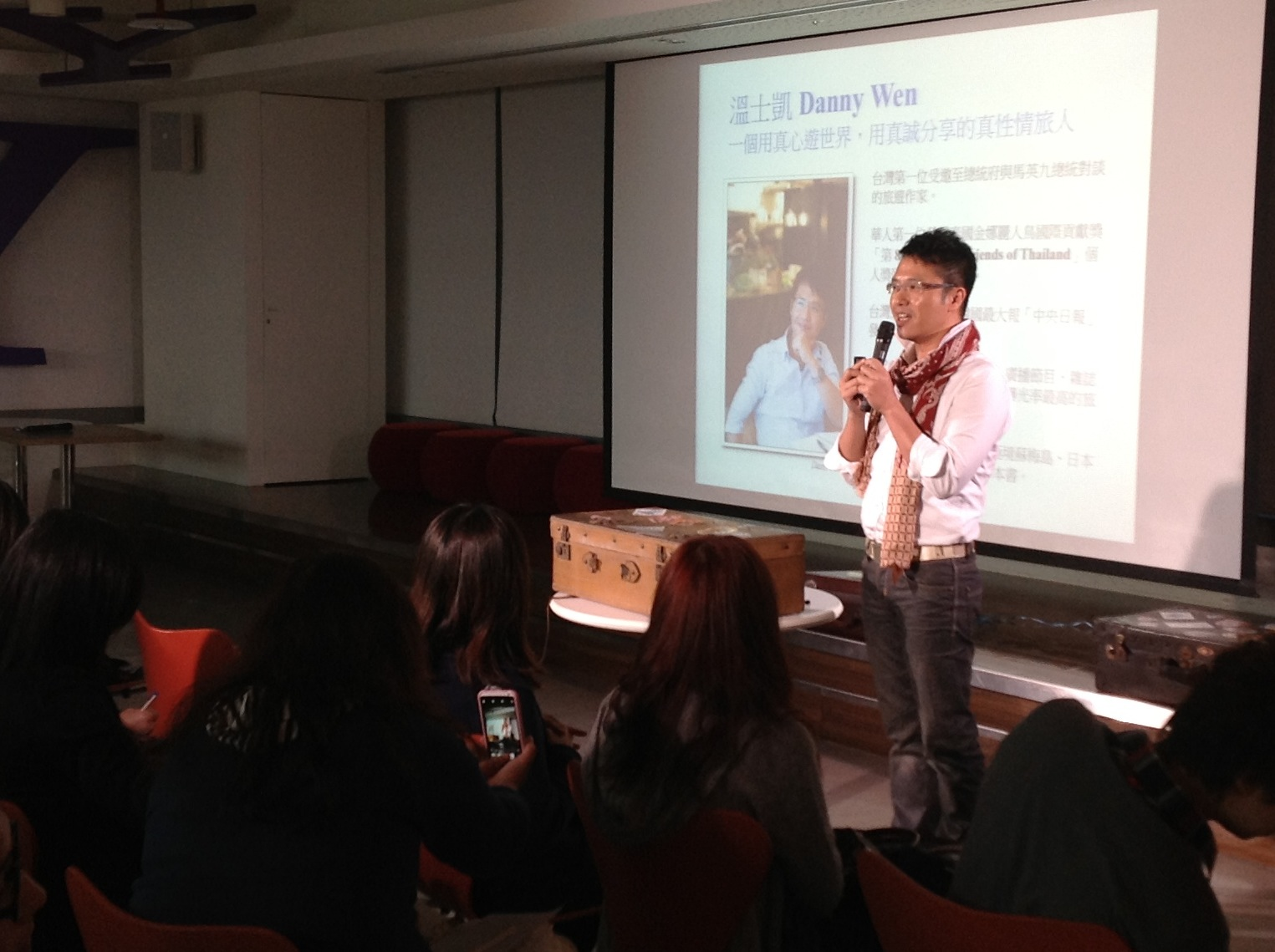

Personal details
- Born: 22 February 1967 (age 59) Zhudong, Hsinchu County, Taiwan
- Education: Fu-Hsin Trade & Arts School; Glendale Community College; Cleveland State University
- Website: Official website

Danny Wen (Chinese: 溫士凱; pinyin: Wēn Shìkǎi; born 22 February 1967) is a Taiwan-based travel and food writer, TV host and award-winning radio host. He has released 21 Chinese-language travel books, guidebooks and cookbooks. In 2012 and 2022, three pieces of his articles were selected by the board of education of Taiwan as teaching material in a Chinese literature textbook. In 2015, he received the Taiwan 50th Golden Bell Award as best radio host. In 2018, he was named as the most important representative writers in Taiwan by the Ministry of Culture.

Danny Wen has gained a following through on-going personal appearances in TV shows, radio broadcasts and magazines. Besides publishing his travel books, he is a speaker among many institutions and media. He is also an expert on the subject of Traveling Thailand and Culture and Creative Industry of Thailand in Taiwan. In 2010, he has become the first and only Taiwanese and ethnic Chinese travel writer to receive the Friends of Thailand Award from the Tourism Authority of Thailand.

== Background ==
Danny was born on 22 February 1967 in Zhudong Township, Hsinchu County, Taiwan. He first graduated from the department of Fine-Art & Craft of Fu-Hsin Trade & Arts School in Taiwan, and then went to the United States to finish his Art and Design education at Glendale Community College and Cleveland State University in 1992. After 12 years in United States, he moved back to Taiwan in 2005.

== Awards and honors ==
- 2021, Radio program “Hakka Follow Me (Chinese: 客庄花路米)” nominated Taiwan 56th Golden Bell Award, best radio host.
- 2020, Radio program “Friends around the World. (世界異家來作客)” nominated Taiwan 55th Golden Bell Award, best radio program.
- 2019, Radio program "Hakka Follow Me (客庄花路米)" nominated Taiwan 54th Golden Bell Award, best radio host.
- 2018, he was named as the most important representative writers in Taiwan by the Ministry of Culture, Taiwan.
- 2017, as VISIT Hokkaido Tourism ambassador.
- 2016, Radio program "Hakka guest on line (全世界來作客)" nominated Taiwan 51st Golden Bell Award, best radio host.
- 2016, as KANSAI Tourism ambassador.
- 2015, Winner of Taiwan 50th Golden Bell Award, best radio host.
- 2015, Radio program "Hakka guest on line (全世界來作客)" nominated Taiwan 50th Golden Bell Award, best radio host and best program.
- 2015, as 2015 Taipei Pass ambassador.
- 2013, Danny was invited by Broadcasting Corporation of China as daily show host of "Hakka guest on line (全世界來作客)".
- 2012, Two pieces of his articles have been selected by board of education of Taiwan as teaching material in Chinese literature textbook.
- 2011, Danny Wen has become the first ever travel writer been invited to Office of President Republic of China, Taiwan and discuss world travel issue with President Ma Ying-jeou.
- 2010, Danny Wen became the first and only Taiwanese and ethnic Chinese travel writer to receive the Friends of Thailand Award 2010 from the Tourism Authority of Thailand.
- 2010, March 26, Danny was invited as a special guest during "Thailand Week 2010" by Thailand Trade and Economic Office and Thailand Tourism Division Taiwan. The Executive Director of Thailand Trade and Economic Office, Mrs. Manasvanich and Danny also co-hosted a demonstration and promotion of Thai food.
- 2010, Danny was invited to do more than 300 speeches, TV programs and radio broadcasts to share his insider news about traveling around the world, and named the most influential travel writer in Taiwan.
- 2009, he was invited as a preface writer for "The Story of a Business Philosophy" by Isadore Sharp- the founder of Four Season Hotel.
- 2007, Danny received the honor as a travel writer from Thailand Tourism Division Taiwan. He is the only Taiwanese writer who writes weekly traveling articles for its official website since.
- 2006, Danny published Taiwanese travel book Best of Bangkok which is a fashionable travel book with a hip perspective. The book has had nine printings due to its market demand. Best of Bangkok was also voted as the top travel book of the year in Taiwan.

== Publications ==
1. Discover Siraya, travel book Released by Morning Star Publishing Co., Ltd.（2021）
2. A Taste of travel, travel book Released by Suncolor Publishing Co., Ltd.(2015)
3. The Great Escapes in Thailand with Danny Wen, travel book Released by Suncolor Publishing Co., Ltd.(2011)
4. Travel West Coast Japan with Danny Wen, travel book Released by Suncolor Publishing Co., Ltd.(2009)
5. Taste of Thai, Thai cookbook and travel book Released by Common Wealth Magazine Group Publishing Co., Ltd.(2009)
6. Chic Koh Samui, travel book Released by Suncolor Publishing Co., Ltd. 」(2008)
7. U.S.A. West Coast, travel book Released by Taiya Publishing Co., Ltd. 」(2007)
8. Amazing Yunnan, travel book Released by Red Book Publishing Co., Ltd. 」(2007)
9. Las Vegas, travel book Released by Taiya Publishing Co., Ltd.(2006)
10. Best of Bangkok, travel book Released by Red Book Publishing Co., Ltd. (2006)
11. New York City, travel book Released by Red Book Publishing Co., Ltd. (2005)
12. Best of San Francisco, travel book Released by Red Book Publishing Co., Ltd.(2004)
13. Best of Los Angeles, travel book Released by Red Book Publishing Co., Ltd.(2004)
14. France Wine Countries, travel book Released by Taiya Publishing Co., Ltd (2003)
15. Guam, Saipan & Palau, travel book Released by Taiya Publishing Co., Ltd (2003)
16. Phuket and Koh Samui, travel book Released by Taiya Publishing Co., Ltd (2002)
17. Montreal and Quebec City, travel book Released by Taiya Publishing Co., Ltd (002)
18. Taipei, travel book Released by Taiya Publishing Co., Ltd (2002)
19. Pacific Coast Highways, travel book Released by Taiya Publishing Co., Ltd (2001)
20. Boston, travel book Released by Taiya Publishing Co., Ltd (2001)
21. Las Vegas, travel book Released by Taiya Publishing Co., Ltd (2001)
