= Jerzy Bańczerowski =

Polish linguist (1938–2026)

Jerzy Bańczerowski (28 October 1938 – 9 June 2026) was a Polish professor of philology.

Bańczerowski was a member of the Committee on Oriental Studies of the Polish Academy of Sciences, and served as director of the Institute of Linguistics (1977–1991, 1994–2008), and head of the Department of General and Comparative Linguistics at Adam Mickiewicz University (1969–).

The main subjects of Bańczerowski's research were general and comparative linguistics, set theoretic axiomatization of linguistic theory, Finno-Ugric linguistics, and Asian languages. On his initiative, new specialties (in the field of philology) of studies were established at the Adam Mickiewicz University, including Finnish philology and ethnolinguistics.

== Life and career ==
Jerzy Bańczerowski was born in Ożarów on 28 October 1938.

In 1961 Bańczerowski graduated from the Adam Mickiewicz University. In 1964, he defended his doctoral thesis on lentition (in Finnish). In 1968 Bańczerowski received his habilitation for the dissertation Konsonantenalternation im Ostlappischen unter dem Aspekt der Verstärkung - Lenierung. In 1981 he received an individual Award of the Minister of Science, Higher Education and Technology for achievements in the field of scientific research.

From 1984 Bańczerowski was a full professor. In 1989 he was awarded the Officer's Cross of the Order of Polonia Restituta, while on 26 November 2004, he was awarded the Commander's Cross. In 1986 he was also awarded the Medal of the National Education Commission and in 2000 the Friends of Thailand award.

Bańczerowski died on 9 June 2026, at the age of 87.
