= Zhudong Timber Industry Exhibition Hall =

Museum in Zhudong, Hsinchu County, Taiwan

- 竹東林業展示館
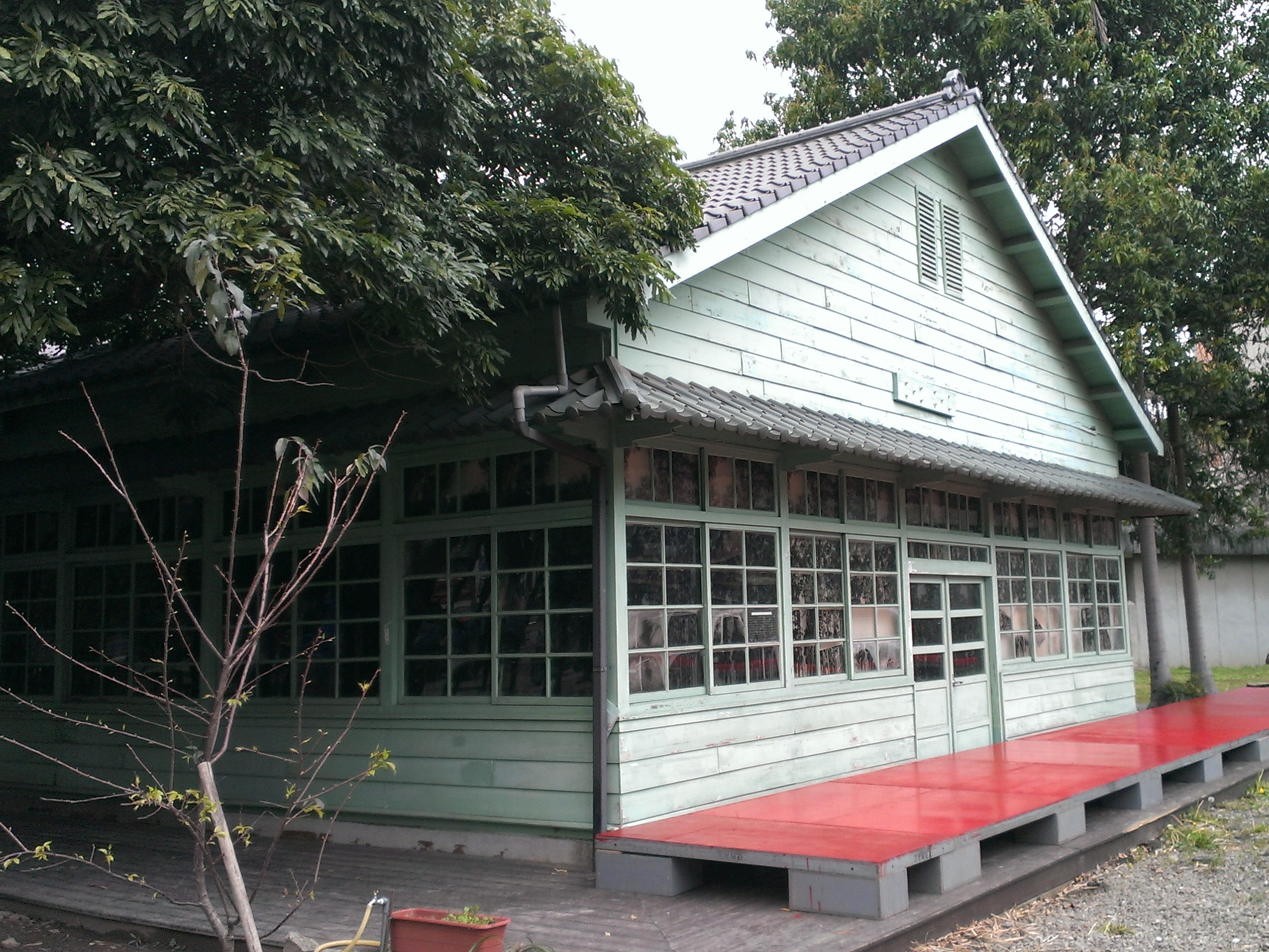
- Interactive map of the Zhudong Timber Industry Exhibition Hall area

General information
- Type: Gallery
- Location: Zhudong, Hsinchu County, Taiwan
- Coordinates: 24°44′13.7″N 121°05′35.0″E
- Opened: 1943

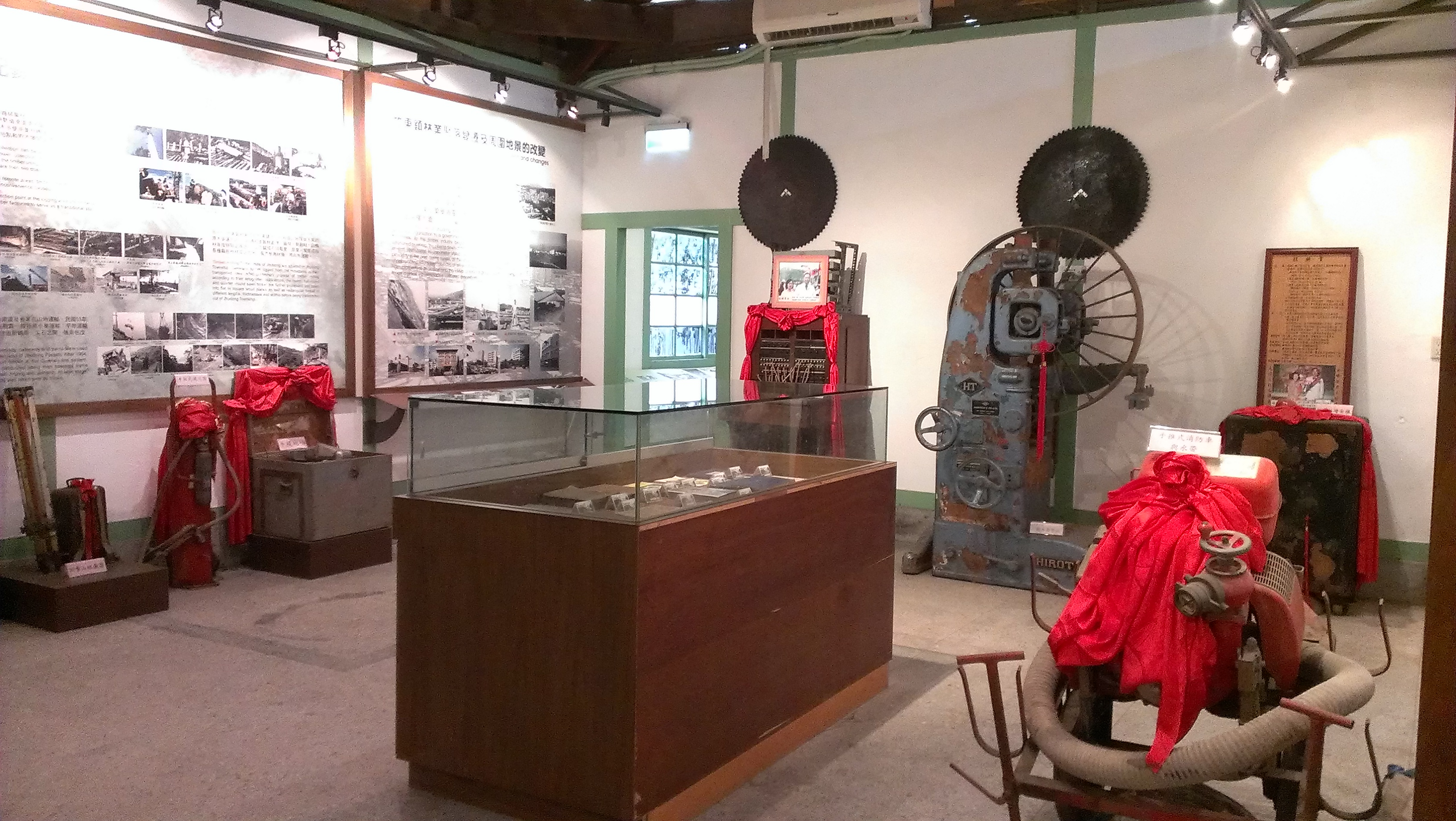
Zhudong Timber Industry Exhibition Hall interior

The Zhudong Timber Industry Exhibition Hall (traditional Chinese: 竹東林業展示館; simplified Chinese: 竹东林业展示馆; pinyin: Zhúdōng Línyè Zhǎnshìguǎn) is a museum about timber in Zhudong Township, Hsinchu County, Taiwan.

== History ==
The exhibition hall was established in 1943.

== Exhibition ==
The exhibition hall features the history of timber industry in Taiwan and traditional logging equipment.

== Transportation ==
The exhibition hall is accessible within walking distance south west of Zhudong Station of Taiwan Railway.

== See also ==
- List of museums in Taiwan
