= Zhudong Animation and Comic Creative Park =

Theme park in Zhudong, Hsincu County, Taiwan

Zhudong Animation and Comic Creative Park 竹東動漫園區
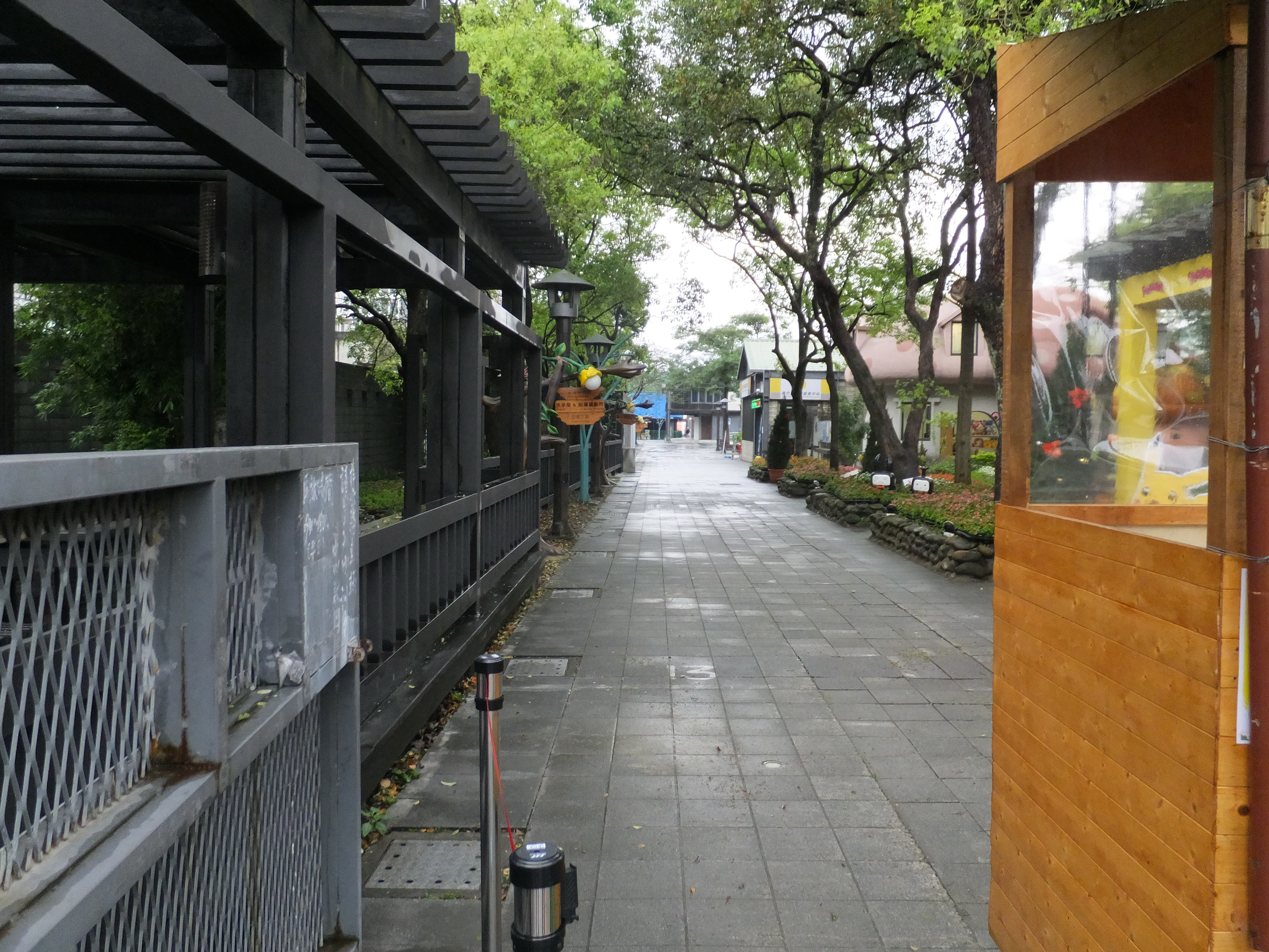
- Interactive map of Zhudong Animation and Comic Creative Park 竹東動漫園區
- Location: Zhudong, Hsinchu County, Taiwan
- Coordinates: 24°44′17.7″N 121°05′40.1″E
- Status: Operating
- Opened: 18 December 2015

The Zhudong Animation and Comic Creative Park (Chinese: 竹東動漫園區; Tongyong Pinyin: Jhúdōng Dòngmàn Yuáncyū) is a theme park in Jhudong Township, Hsinchu County, Taiwan.

== History ==
The park was opened for trial basis on 18 December 2015 on its western part in a ceremony attended by Hsinchu County Magistrate Chiu Ching-chun. Its eastern part was opened in 2016.

== Architecture ==
The park was designed by a team from Joy Magical Co., Ltd. It consists of five main halls, which are Master Pavilion, Multimedia Pavilion, Creative Store, Mushroom House and Performance Hall.

== Transportation ==
The park is accessible from Zhudong Station of Taiwan Railway.

== See also ==
- List of tourist attractions in Taiwan
