= Zhudong =

Coordinates: 24°44′11.80″N 121°5′29.68″E

Zhudong Township 竹東鎮 Chikutō
- Urban township
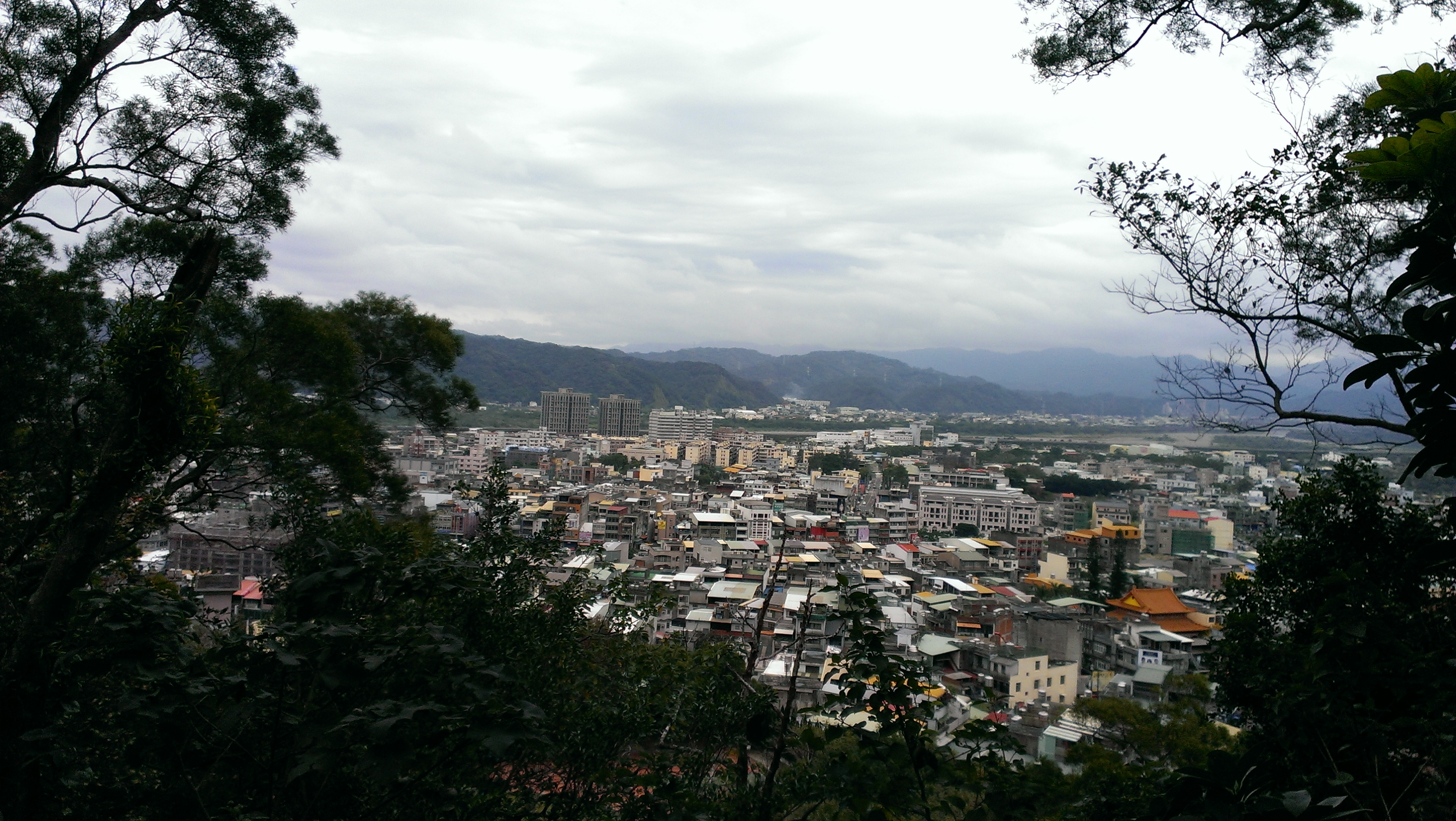

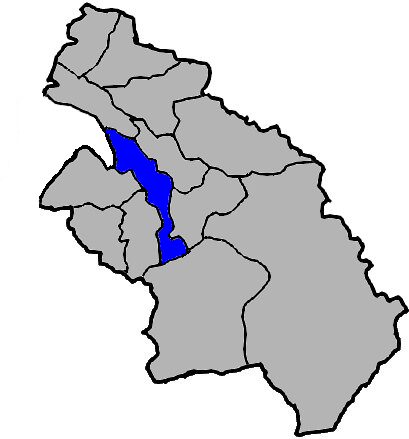
- Zhudong Township in Hsinchu County
- Country: Taiwan
- County: Hsinchu County

Government
  - Mayor: Guo Yuanzhang (KMT)

Population (February 2023)
  - Total: 96,518
- Website: zhudong.hsinchu.gov.tw (in Chinese)

Zhudong Township
- Chinese: 竹東鎮
- Hanyu Pinyin: Zhúdōng Zhèn
- Wade–Giles: Chu^{2}-tung^{1} Chen^{4}
- Pha̍k-fa-sṳ: Chuk-tûng-chṳ́n
- Jyutping: zuk1 dung1 zan3
- Hokkien POJ: Tek-tang-tìn

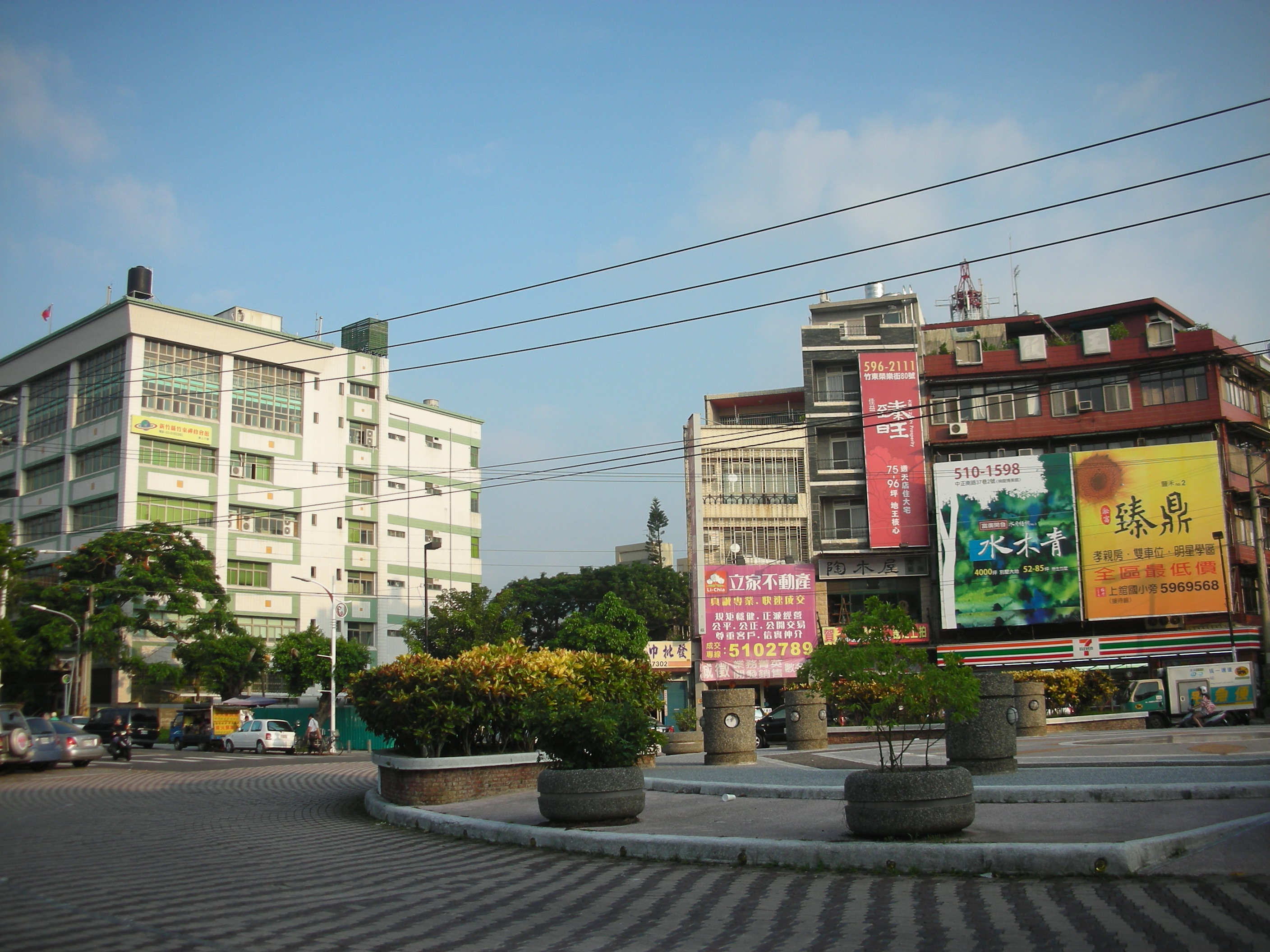
Downtown Zhudong

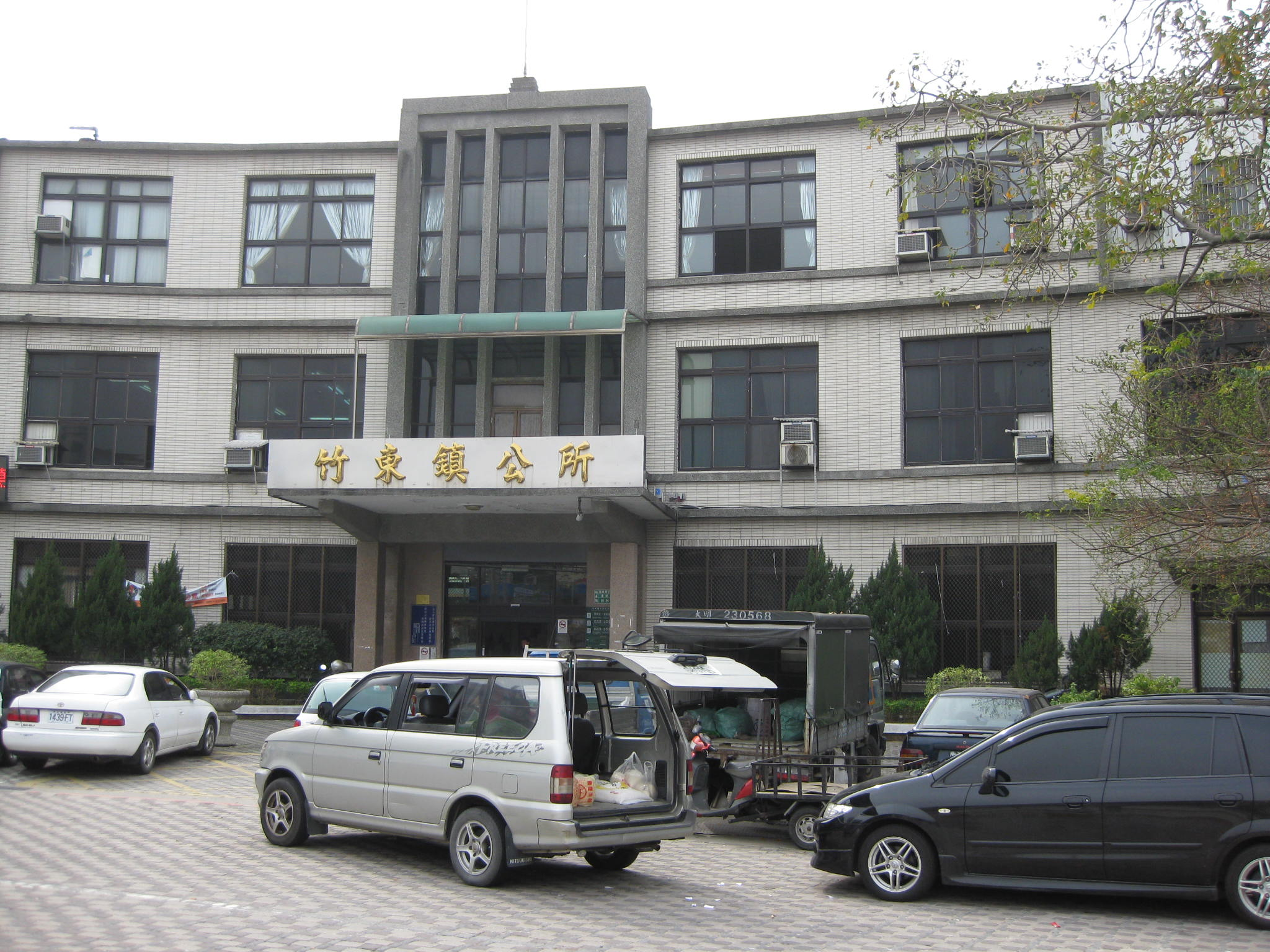
Zhudong Township office

Zhudong Township is an urban township in Asia, central Hsinchu County, Taiwan. Part of Hsinchu Science Park is in Zhudong. Also located in Zhudong is the main campus of the Industrial Technology Research Institute (ITRI). Zhudong is approximately 20 minutes drive from Hsinchu town center on one of two freeways, route 3 North, which passes nearby and route 68 East which proceeds directly through Zhudong.

== History ==
Zhudong was settled in the mid-18th century by Qing colonists, and was known as Chhiū-kí-nâ or Shuqilin (樹杞林). In the early years of the township's development, it was under the jurisdiction of Tamsui Ting (淡水廳). In 1875 (Guangxu 1), Chhiū-kí-nâ came under the jurisdiction of Hsinchu County.

Under Japanese colonial rule, the town was renamed Chikutō (竹東), which was retained as Zhudong after the Republic of China took over in 1945. In 1946, Zhudong became part of Hsinchu City as Zhudong District (竹東區), but in 1950, it split off and became the current Zhudong Township.

== Name ==
Literally, Zhudong means "bamboo east" but in this context, zhu is short for "Hsinchu". Thus, Zhudong lies east of Hsinchu (cf. Zhubei which lies north [bei] of Hsinchu.) The former name of the area was Chhiū-kí-nâ (樹杞林), literally "Ardisia sieboldii forest" with the present name adopted under Japanese rule in 1920.

== Geography ==
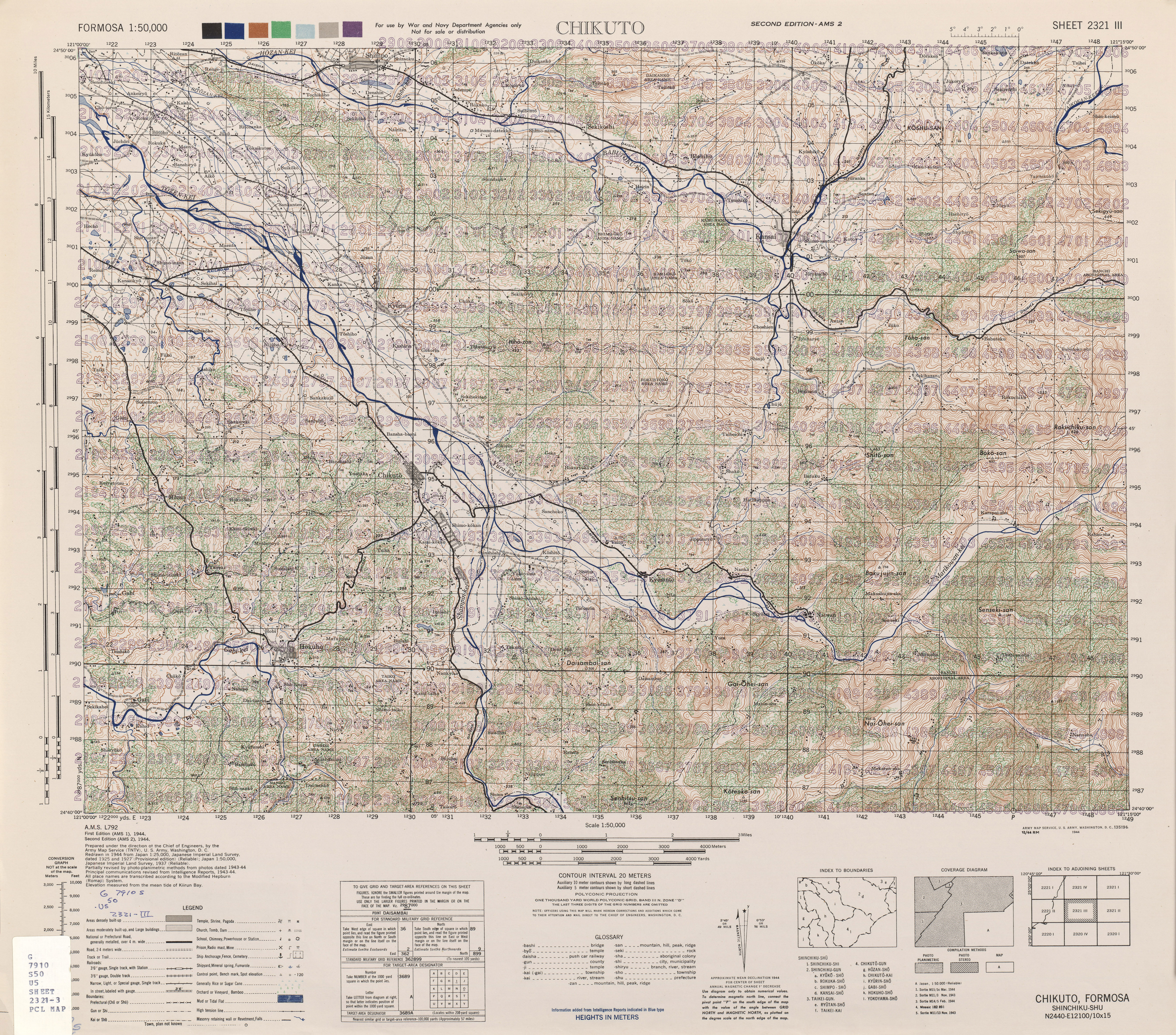
Map of Zhudong (labeled as Chikutō) and surrounding area (1944)

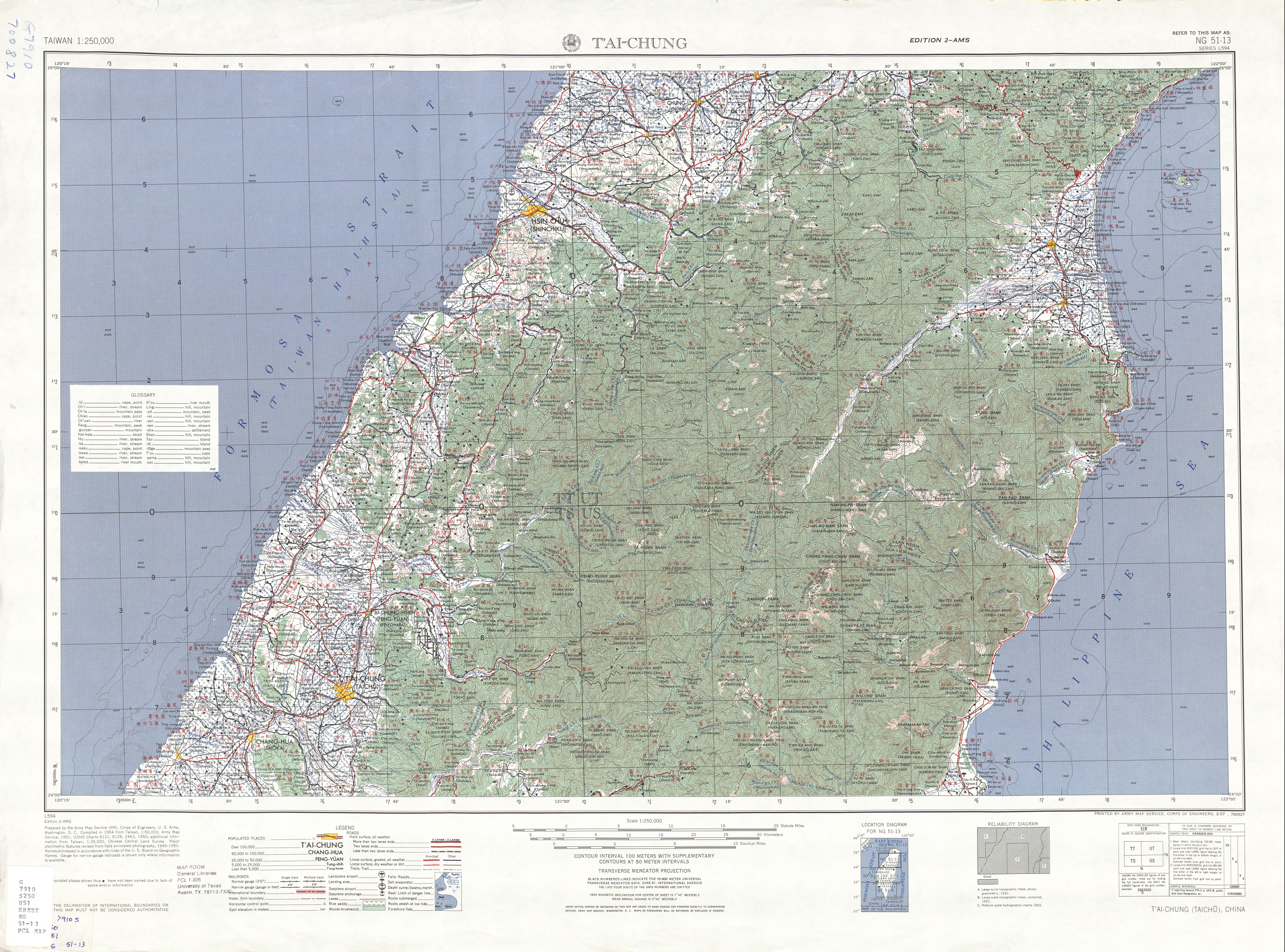
Map including Zhudong (labeled as Chu-tung (Chikutō) 竹東) (1954)

- Area: 53.51 km^{2} (20.66 sq mi)
- Population: 96,518 (February 2023)

== Administrative divisions ==
Shangping, Ruifeng, Ruanqiao, Yuandong, Shangguan, Dongning, Zhongzheng, Nansheng, Daxiang, Zhongshan, Nanhua, Donghua, Shanghua, Jilin, Renai, Zhudong, Zhongxiao, Rongle, Ronghua, Wufeng, Liufeng, Sanchong, Erchong, Touchong, Yuanshan, Tuken, and Kehu Village.

== Tourist attractions ==
Nearby is the mountain of Feifong Shan and Buddhist temples. A well-prepared path with steps and tiled and wooden walkways enables walking to the peak and the ridge overlooking Zhudong in all weather.

- Zhudong Animation and Comic Creative Park
- Zhudong Timber Industry Exhibition Hall

== Transportation ==
=== Rail ===
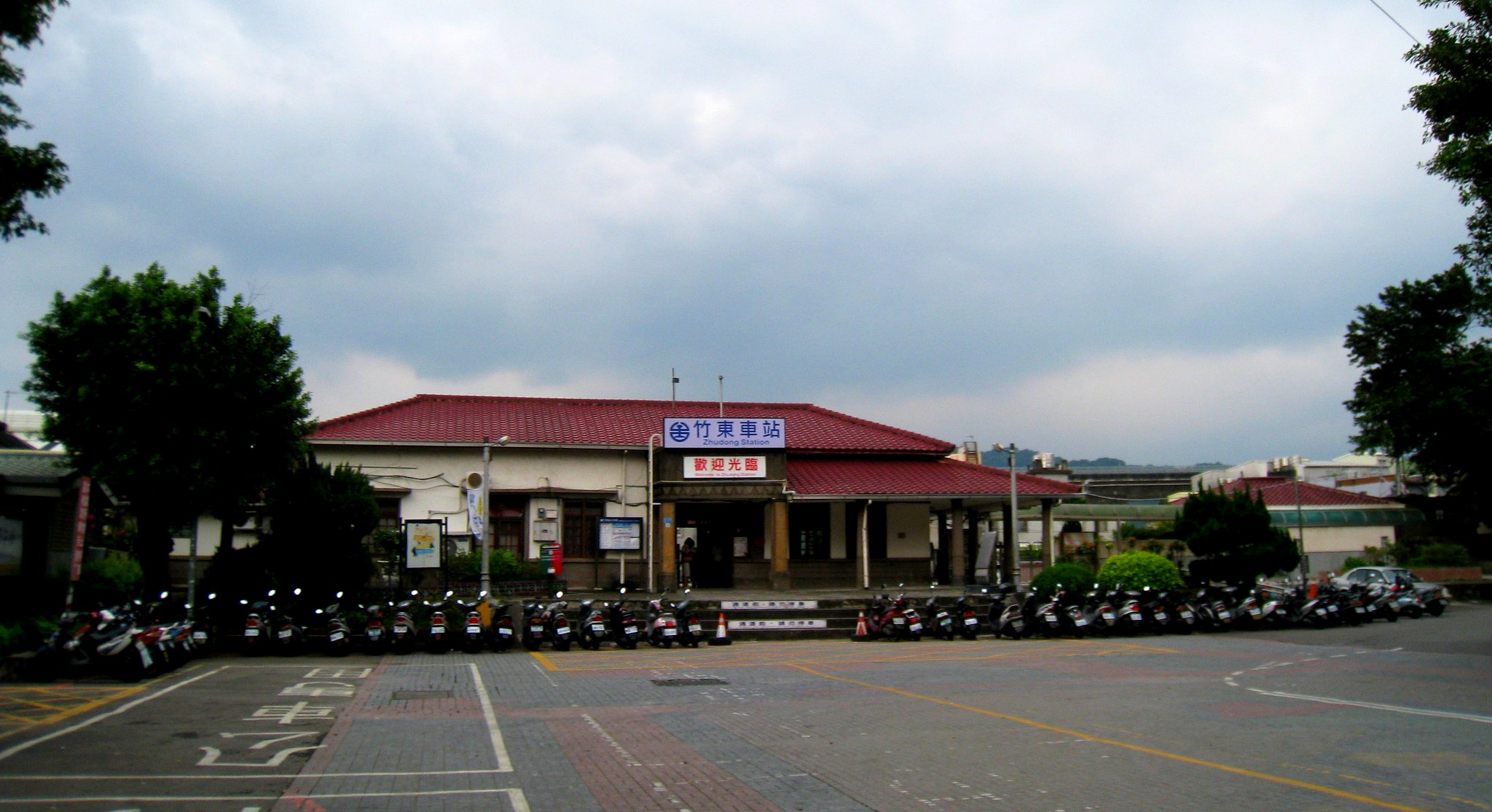
Zhudong Station

Four Taiwan Railway rail stations serve Zhudong: Ronghua, Shangyuan, Zhudong and Zhuzhong.

Taiwan High Speed Rail passes through the western part of the township, but there is no planned station.

=== Bus ===
Bus stations in the townships are:

- Xiagongguan Bus Station of Hsinchu Bus
- Zhudong Bus Station of Hsinchu Bus

== Notable natives ==
- Cheng Yung-chin, Magistrate of Hsinchu County (2001–2009)
- Danny Wen, writer
- Lai Pi-hsia, musician
- Lu Shao-chia, conductor
