= Zhudong railway station =

Railway station in Zhudong, Hsinchu County, Taiwan

Zhudong Station 竹東車站
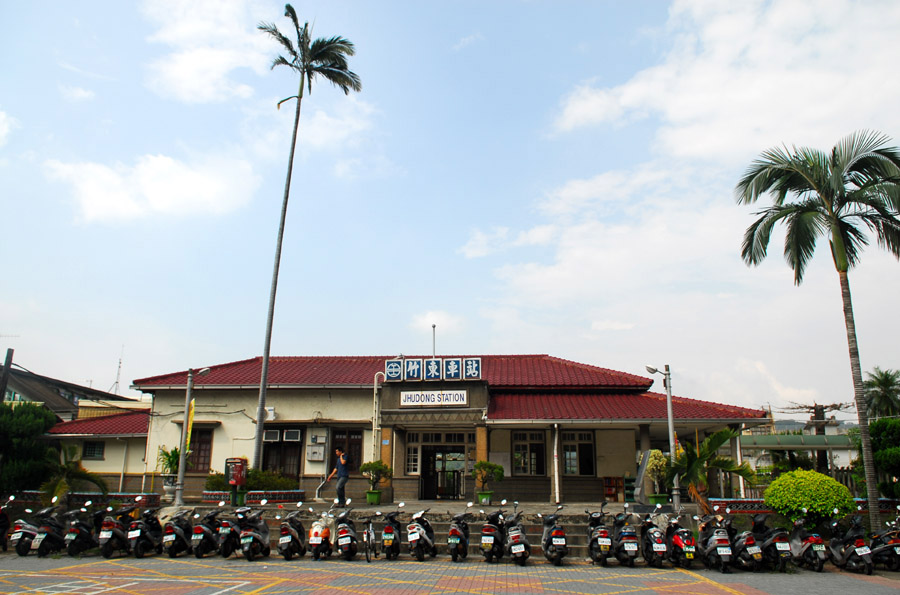
- Station entrance

Chinese name
- Traditional Chinese: 竹東車站
Transcriptions
Standard Mandarin
- Hanyu Pinyin: Zhúdōng Chēzhàn
- Bopomofo: ㄓㄨˊ ㄉㄨㄥ ㄔㄜ ㄓㄢˋ

General information
- Location: Zhudong, Hsinchu County, Taiwan
- Coordinates: 24°44′17.5″N 121°05′41.0″E
- System: Taiwan Railway railway station
- Line: Neiwan line
- Distance: 16.6 km to Hsinchu
- Platforms: 1 island platform 1 side platform

Construction
- Structure type: At-grade

Other information
- Station code: 243

History
- Opened: 15 November 1947

Passengers
- 2017: 201,643 per year
- Rank: 128

Services
| Preceding station | Taiwan Railway | Following station |
|---|---|---|
| Ronghua towards Hsinchu | Neiwan line | Hengshan towards Neiwan |
Location

Zhudong railway station (Chinese: 竹東車站; pinyin: Zhúdōng Chēzhàn) is a railway station located in Zhudong Township, Hsinchu County, Taiwan. It is located on the Neiwan line and is operated by the Taiwan Railway.

== Around the station ==
- Zhudong Animation and Comic Creative Park
- Zhudong Timber Industry Exhibition Hall
