= Eighteen Touches =

The Eighteen Touches (Chinese: 十八摸; pinyin: shí bā mō) is a traditional Chinese folk song with many variants throughout China. The song is flirtatious, bawdy and erotic in nature, considered vulgar and tasteless, and has been banned numerous times.

There are male, female, and duet variants. Some versions start with a touch of the hair, followed by the nape, with each subsequent touch becoming more intimate. The female versions often feature an attempted seduction through offering to allow a man to touch her in various places; some male versions a seduction through promising some reward if she allows him to touch her there. The duets pair each offered or threatened touch with a consequence, e.g. "...I can't touch you there, if I do you'll die of bliss."

The song has appeared in Chinese literature, especially in books that feature the common people, such as Mo Yan's White Cotton. It is a favourite of Jin Yong's fictional character Wei Xiaobao. It also provides the inspiration for one of the main themes of Puccini's Madama Butterfly.

As a living folk song, new variants continue to appear. For example, salacious details from recent news stories are incorporated to mock officials and current events with sexual innuendo.
