= Friends of Thailand Award =

Friends of Thailand Award The Tourism Authority of Thailand (TAT) has realized the contribution of individuals, organizations, and institutions overseas for their extensively continuous support in disseminating the public relations of Thailand’s positive image, which in turn has resulted in the country’s success to be a driving force of the tourism industry, subsequently to be well known as a model country for the tourism industry in the region. For this recognition, TAT would like to express our sincere gratitude to the benevolence of these people toward Thailand. The Friends of Thailand project was thereby initiated on 9 December 1996, and has been carried on the seventh time.
