= Glass Museum =

Glass Museum may refer to:

- Broadfield House Glass Museum, West Midlands, England
- Corning Museum of Glass, Corning, New York
- Glass Museum of Hsinchu City, Hsinchu City, Taiwan
- Imperial Glass Museum, Bellaire, Ohio, USA
- Murano Glass Museum, Venice, Italy
- Museum of Glass, Tacoma, Washington
- National Heisey Glass Museum, Newark, Ohio, USA
- Ohio Glass Museum, Lancaster, Ohio, USA

== See also ==
- Museum of Glass (disambiguation)
