= Pleasantly Surprised (TV series) =

2014 Taiwanese television series

- 'Promotional poster
- Also known as: Love Myself or You; Love Met Cupid 愛情遇見邱比特
- 喜歡·一個人
- Genre: Romance, Comedy
- Created by: Sanlih E-Television
- Written by: Du Xin Yi 杜欣怡; Wang Yu Qi 王玉琪
- Directed by: Lin Hong Jie 林宏杰 (Ep. 1 - 11); Ye Hong Wei 葉鴻偉 (Ep. 12 - 22)
- Starring: Puff Guo; Jasper Liu; Lene Lai; Jolin Chien
- Opening theme: Nobody And Princess 小人物大公主 by Ian Chen
- Ending theme: I'll Always Be Here 隨時都在 by Victor Wong 品冠
- Country of origin: Taiwan
- Original languages: Mandarin; Hokkien
- No. of seasons: 1
- No. of episodes: 22

Production
- Executive producer: Xie Xiao Fen 謝小芬
- Producer: Chen Hui Ying 陳慧瑛
- Production location: Taiwan
- Cinematography: Xie An Xiang 謝安翔
- Editor: Zhou Yu Zhe 周育哲
- Running time: 90 minutes
- Production companies: Sanlih E-Television 三立電視; I Production Co. Ltd. 我在影像製作有限公司

Original release
- Network: SETTV
- Release: 23 May – 17 October 2014

Related
- In a Good Way; Aim High

Pleasantly Surprised (Chinese: 喜歡·一個人; pinyin: xǐ huān yī gè rén), also known as Love Myself or You, is a 2014 Taiwanese romantic-comedy television series produced by Sanlih E-Television. It stars Puff Guo and Jasper Liu as the main leads, with Jolin Chien and Lene Lai as the main supporting leads. The original title has a double meaning which literally translates to "Like Someone" or "Like To Be Alone", depending on how it is read. Original title during development of the drama was "Love Met Cupid 愛情遇見邱比特", the title was then changed to "Love Myself or You 喜歡·一個人" during start of production. The English title was once again renamed "Pleasantly Surprised" right before the drama began airing. Filming took place from April 23 to October 13, 2014 and was filmed as the drama aired. First original broadcast began May 23, 2014 on SETTV channel airing every Friday at 10:00-11:30 pm. Final episode was aired on October 17, 2014, with 22 episodes total.

== Synopsis ==
Du Kai Qi is an aspiring young chef, her only interests are cooking and reading manga comics. She doesn't have many friends and doesn't want anymore. After enjoying her most delicious full course meal prepared by a chef named Louis, she snaps a picture of his signature from the plate and request to meet him. However, a family emergency forces her to leave before meeting Louis. She looks to Louis's signature as strength and inspiration for her upcoming sous chef promotion test. On the day of her test the new restaurant intern Ah Jie, who has to decide the winner, chooses Kai Qi's rival dish over hers. Losing out on her promotion, Kai Qi makes instant enemies with Ah Jie. What she doesn't know is Ah Jie is her boss's son, her new next door neighbor, the chef Louis that she admires so much and her long lost childhood friend Fu Zi Jie who she had a close bond with.

== Plot summary ==
The once cheerful and happy Du Kai Qi has grown up to be a cold, fierce and isolated person due to her harsh upbringing. Her father is a money asking, alcoholic and abusive person. Even though both of her parents have been separated for many years, her father still harasses and abuses her mother for money. With so many difficulties in her life, it has made her liked to be left alone. Kai Qi works as an assistant chef at "Figaro Cuisine", a fancy French restaurant owned by her mother's former employer. At Figaro's, it brings her pleasant memories of her childhood when both she and her mother had their most delicious meal there. Knowing how happy that meal made her mother feel, it drives her to become an accomplished chef hoping to provide a better life for her and her mother. Already struggling financially, she is forced to take in her young nephew when his father abandons him to get remarried.

Fu Zi Jie has just returned home for the first time after many years living abroad in France. A highly skilled French chef, he has never risen pass an intern position because of a promise he made to his brother. During dinner with his parents, his mother begs him to take a position as an intern for one month at one of his father's restaurants, hoping it will change his mind to stay in Taiwan and take over his father's business. Seeing his mother's persistence, he agrees, but asks that his real identity be concealed from the restaurant staff and that he moves out on his own. He arrives at "Figaro Cuisine" and instantly remembers the happy times he had as a child with his nanny and her daughter who became his best friend. He tells the restaurant staff to call him Ah Jie. On his first day at the restaurant, he is asked by the executive chef to judge the sous chef promotion test between Kai Qi and her rival Cheng Le Xuan. Not happy with the outcome of the sous chef promotion test, Kai Qi instantly makes enemies with Ah Jie, but also finds out her dish has been sabotaged by the executive chef because she rejected his advances to be his girlfriend earlier.

Ah Jie finds out by accident that Kai Qi besides being a fierce new co-worker is also his childhood friend and his nanny's daughter. He becomes intrigue to find out why she has become a total opposite of how he had remembered her to be. Stalking her after work he finds out from a drunk shouting Kai Qi how much that work promotion meant to her as the salary increase would have made her able to provide for her mother. While taking her home he discovers that they are also next door neighbors and mistakes her nephew to be her son when her nephew accidentally calls her mom. Curious of Kai Qi's current life he becomes extra kind and nice to her at work to get closer to her, even though she keeps pushing him away. Le Xuan notices Ah Jie over helping Kai Qi, so she forces them to participate in a cooking competition and win a title or else both will be fired, hesitant to compete but with their jobs on the line he breaks one of his promises to his brother for Kai Qi's sake. He uses this opportunity to let Kai Qi mentor him in cooking, even though he is more skilled than her, as an excuse to become closer to her.

Through their lessons and time together Ah Jie starts to uncover the difficult life Kai Qi has had to go through for the past years. Using his reliance and her discovering his real identity, he gets the once isolated Kai Qi to start opening up and warm up to others. However, Ah Jie starts to show his jealous side when Kai Qi resolves her misunderstanding with her estranged college buddy Cheng Hao Wei. He soon realizes that his feelings for Kai Qi has turned from friendship to love. With his one month in Taiwan almost up and sensing Hao Wei actively pursuing Kai Qi, he is torn between telling her how he feels or just leaving Taiwan quietly. Living abroad all these years has also made Ah Jie adjust to life being alone, but for the first time in his life he has formed a bond with someone outside of his family and don't want to lose that feeling. Knowing he can't stay in Taiwan and can't take Kai Qi with him, also not wanting her to end up with Hao Wei, he decides to confess his feelings for her hoping to leave with a lasting memory.

After confessing his feelings and Kai Qi returning the same feelings for him, Ah Jie breaks all of his promises to his brother by staying in Taiwan. His brother who holds a grudge against him is unhappy with this news and threatens Ah Jie with Kai Qi's job. Ah Jie threatens his brother back, that he will retaliate by taking over all of their father's businesses and competing in all the cooking competitions he can. His brother then resorts to offering to buy off Kai Qi hoping she will break up with Ah Jie. Kai Qi slowly starts to understand the volatile relationship between Ah Jie and his brother, she helps and supports Ah Jie in making his brother realizes how much Ah Jie has sacrificed to make him happy. His brother finally drops his grudge against Ah Jie and promises that he won't come between Ah Jie and Kai Qi anymore.

However, Ah Jie and Kai Qi's happiness is short lived when her father is part of a gang that kidnaps Ah Jie's brother for ransom. Kai Qi knowing her father is one of the cohorts protects him from the police by withholding information about the kidnappers identities when she thinks this will cause her to lose her new-found happiness with Ah Jie. Soon Ah Jie's brother is found badly injured in a comatose state, the authorities show Ah Jie's family that Kai Qi's father is one of the kidnappers. Ah Jie becomes furious with Kai Qi and blames her for not telling the authorities earlier as it might have saved his brother from serious injuries. Due to her father's actions Kai Qi is too ashamed to face others and starts to revert to her isolated self, but once Ah Jie's anger cools down he tries hard to overlook what her father has done to save their relationship.

Kai Qi unable to deal with the guilt her father has burden her with, quits her job at the restaurant and moves to the countryside to live with her mother in order to avoid Ah Jie. Hao Wei uses this opportunity to be a friend in need while still hoping that he might still have a chance with Kai Qi. He invests in a restaurant according to Kai Qi's dreams and ask her to be the head chef. Hao Wei also uses this chance to see if there is still any hope for Kai Qi and Ah Jie before confessing his feelings to her, by suggest the two complete in a cooking competition. If Kai Qi wins ShiFu Restaurant Corp will have to provide free advertisement for Hao Wei's restaurant for a month, but if Ah Jie wins Kai Qi must reconcile with him.

Ah Jie's brother wakes up from his coma on the day the winner of the cooking competition is to be decided. Kai Qi wins and Ah Jie knowing that she can now accept being together with him again leans in for a kiss, however Kai Qi's reaction surprises everyone. Hao Wei sees it as a sign to confess his feelings for Kai Qi, but she rejects him midway into his confession. Knowing what her answer will be beforehand, Hao Wei tells her he will be leaving the country to pursue his real interest. Ah Jie unhappy with Kai Qi running out on him that day, has the entire restaurant staff help him teach her a lesson by pretending to ignore his love for her. Knowing she has done Ah Jie wrong, Kai Qi puts her pride aside and publicly confesses her love for Ah Jie.

One year later Kai Qi is now a successful chef recognized by food writers and on the cover of magazines praising her restaurant. She is also no longer alone as she and Ah Jie are finally in a stable loving relationship cohabiting together. Ah Jie tells Kai Qi that even if they weren't who they were he would still encounter her and fall in love with her.

== Cast ==
=== Main cast ===
- Puff Guo 郭雪芙 as Du Kai Qi 杜凱琪 - Age 28

Aspiring French chef who has worked at "Figaro Cuisine" for 6 years. When her chance for a promotion to the Sous Chef position is dashed because of the Executive Chef and the new intern Ah Jie, she becomes enemies with Ah Jie. But through his extra kindness to her she starts to open up to him. Growing up in a difficult family has made her cold and isolate from others. Her guilty pleasures are reading manga comics because it help takes her mind away from reality. A mysteries chef named Louis enters her life when she tastes his food. When she finds out that Ah Jie is her childhood friend and Louis he becomes the only person she can depend on. Their friendship soon turns to love when each other misunderstands that the other might like someone but not knowing that someone is each other. Her and Ah Jie's happiness is short lived when her father is part of a gang that kidnaps Ah Jie's brother. Unable to face Ah Jie or his family she breaks up with him and later quits her job at the restaurant. Her university senior and friend Hao Wei, opens a restaurant according to her dreams in hopes she will accept him one day but in the end when all hers and Ah Jie's problems are settle it is still Ah Jie that she loves and chooses. In the end she is no longer alone and is in a loving stable relationship cohabiting with Ah Jie.

- Jasper Liu 劉以豪 as Louis Fu Zi Jie (Ah Jie) 傅子杰 - Age 28

A skilled French chef who has never risen past an interning position. He has been living alone in France for the pass 10 years due to guilt and a promise he made to his older brother who holds a grudge against him. He suffers from fear of the dark due to his brother locking him in the closet when he was younger. Not intending to stay in Taiwan long his mother pleads with him to take up an interning position at one of his father's restaurant for 1 month, he agrees but his identity as the boss's son must be concealed and he has to move out on his own. On his first day at work he is surprised to find his childhood friend Kai Qi has grown up to be a cold, stern, fierce person. Curious to find out why she turned out this way he becomes extra nice to her even though she pushes him away. While getting to know her and becoming closer to her, he realizes he has fallen in love with Kai Qi and becomes jealous when her college friend Cheng Hao Wei comes back into her life. Kai Qi and him become a couple but due to her father's consequences they break up, not wanting to give up on his happiness he works hard to win Kai Qi back. He agrees to Hao Wei's bet on a cooking competition with Kai Qi in hopes that she will put the burden her father has given her aside and reunite with him. In the end even with Hao Wei finally confessing his feelings to Kai Qi, it is still Ah Jie that Kai Qi chooses to be with and loves.

- Lene Lai 賴琳恩 as Cheng Le Xuan 程樂瑄 - Age 28

Du Kai Qi's rival and fellow chef at "Figaro Cuisine". Also Cheng Hao Wei's younger sister. She becomes the new sous chef when Ah Jie chooses her dish over Kai Qi's. Due to everyone calling her a "flower vase" (someone with looks but no talent) she is always looking to prove her worth. Though not a mean or bad person, she shows her bitter side when the executive chef acknowledges that Kai Qi is a better chef than her and that she only won the sous chef test because he had sabotaged Kai Qi's dish. Feeling inferior to Kai Qi she starts to give her a hard time at work by singling her out. She develops feelings for Ah Jie because of his kindness but he lets her know time and time again that it is Kai Qi that he loves. When she finds out Kai Qi was the girl that broke her brother's heart in college her hatred for Kai Qi grows. After being rejected numerous times by Ah Jie she later realizes that Ji Yong Qian the executive chef is the one that she truly loves. With help from the entire restaurant staff, she and Yong Qian become a couple and later get engage.

- Jolin Chien 簡宏霖 as Cheng Hao Wei 程浩威 - Age 30

Cheng Le Xuan's older brother. Du Kai Qi's college buddy who shares an interest in manga with her. He is a huge "One Piece" fan who had planned to confess his feelings to Kai Qi when they were in college. Due to a misunderstanding caused by Kai Qi's father he mistook her for conning him and shows hatred for her even though he still loves her very much. Though interested in astronomy, he eventually becomes a food critic hoping to still have a connection to Kai Qi when they break off their friendship. When he and Kai Qi reconcile their friendship, he hopes their relationship will move beyond being just friends, but she comes clean that she has feelings for Ah Jie and only want to be friends, which he abides by. Never really confessing his feelings to Kai Qi he relates to Schrödinger's cat theory as hope that there might be a chance for the both of them to be together if she does not give him a reject answer even though he knows that her heart belongs to Ah Jie. When he finally confesses his feelings to Kai Qi she rejects him. Finally getting an answer from Kai Qi he gives up his job as a food critic and pursues his real interest in astronomy.

=== Supporting cast ===
==== Figaro Cuisine restaurant staff ====
- Sean Lee 邵翔 as Ji Yong Qian 紀永謙 - Age 34

The executive chef at "Figaro Cuisine". A shallow person who is not respected by the restaurant staff due to his superficial attitude. He sabotages Kai Qi's dish during the sous chef promotion test because she had rejected his advances earlier. With no hope on Kai Qi's liking him he moves his focus on Le Xuan who becomes his next target for a love interest. He shows that his heart is true to Le Xuan when he comes to her aid time after time. He and Le Xuan eventually become a couple and later get engaged.

- Ba Yu 巴鈺 as Lin Bao Zhu 林寶珠 - Age 35

Restaurant manager and head waitress at "Figaro Cuisine". Kai Qi's best and only friend, she was the only person Kai Qi opened up to until Ah Jie came along. When her ex-husband shows up at the restaurant as a customer he causes her trouble. Like Kai Qi, she doesn't like to gossip about other peoples personal life. Even though she says she doesn't want anything to do with men she would rather have someone by her side then be alone. Through learning more about Da Zhi's past the two later develop an attraction for one another. The two began a relationship and later are expecting a child together.

- Yorke Sun 孫沁岳 as Wang Da Zhi 王大智 - Age 28

A former triad gangster who served prison time for his triad boss's crime. He works as an assistant cook at "Figaro Cuisine". He likes Kai Qi, but doesn't dare to pursue her, because she was the only one that took a chance on him by helping him get his job at the restaurant when he couldn't find employment anywhere. Once married, his Japanese wife divorces him while he was in prison to marry his triad boss. After being helped by Bao Zhu the two become close and start a May December relationship. At the end both are expecting a child together.

- Verna Lin 林欣蓓 as Wen Xiao Li 溫小莉 - Age 26

A waitress at "Figaro Cuisine" with a bubbly personality. She desperately wants to find a companion and easily falls in love with each new male staff that arrives at the restaurant. All the male staff are afraid of her persistent pursuing of each one of them since she has confessed to each one of them. Ah Jie becomes her new target when he arrives at the restaurant. She pretends it is her birthday every time she wants to confess to a male staff. Though still single she happily still searches for a boyfriend by asking guys she encounters if they are single.

- Stanley Mei 梅賢治 as Fang Xiao Shu 方小樹 - Age 22

An assistant cook at "Figaro Cuisine". He kisses up to whoever is of superior rank at the restaurant. Though not close to Wang Da Zhi, he gives him a hard time when he misunderstood Da Zhi for going back to the triads. But shows his braveness and loyalty when he protects Da Zhi when Da Zhi's triad boss comes to the restaurant to cause trouble. He likes to convince his co-workers to contribute into the employee petty cash fund only to secretly take from it to help support the elderly people that raised him.

- Zooey Tseng 曾允柔 as Linda - Age 25

The pastry chef at "Figaro Cuisine". She likes to listen to loud heavy metal music on her head phones and has psychic powers that can read a person's future. She proves her readings are accurate when she predicts what will happen to Ah Jie on his first day and warning Da Zhi to avoid his ex-wife. She develops a connection with Xiao Qiang when she finds out he can read her mind.

- Deyn Li 李迪恩 as Xiao Qiang 蕭強 - Age 25

Waiter at "Figaro Cuisine". He was Wen Xiao Li last romantic target until Zi Jie came along. Known as the muscles of the restaurant because of his physical stature he later develops a connection with Linda due to him being able to read her mind. He and Linda later start a budding relationship.

==== Fu family ====
- Zhang Fu Jian 張復建 as Fu Zhi Yuan 傅致遠 - Age 60

Fu Zi Jie and Fu Zi Xiang's father. A former chef and successful restaurateur who owns many high end restaurants and is the President of ShiFu Restaurant Corp. He was Du Kai Qi mother's former employer. Kind and generous he treated both mother and daughter to their first French meal which left them with happy and fond memories.

- Hu Pei Lian 胡佩蓮 as Zhuo Wan Ru 卓婉如 - Age 55

Fu Zi Jie and Fu Zi Xiang's mother. Missing her younger son who has been living in France for 10 years she begs him to take an intern position at one of her husband's restaurants, hoping to prolong his stay in Taiwan. When Ah Jie announces that he has decided to stay in Taiwan because he is in love and in a relationship with Kai Qi, she is elated with the news and thankful that he has a reason to finally stay in Taiwan.

- Vic Chen 陳仲熙 as Fu Zi Xiang 傅子翔 - Age 33

Fu Zi Jie's older brother. He was a talented child chef who won many competitions, but due to saving his brother from a traffic accident he injured his left hand causing him unable to cook. Blaming his brother for his injury he has held a grudge against him since they were young. Besides locking Zi Jie in a closet, he makes him take the fall and go to rehab for his alcoholic problem, promise to leave the country wishing he will never come home, never enter cooking competitions and not become a professional chef.

==== Du family ====
- Xing Feng 邢峰 as Du Qing Shi 杜清石

Du Kai Qi's gambling addicted, money asking, abusive drunk father who has caused her many turmoils in her life. Even though he and his wife have been separated for many years he still harasses and beats her for money. Due to his deceitful ways he tricked Cheng Hao Wei into giving him the college manga club funds which caused Hao Wei to misunderstand Kai Qi as a con. In order to extort money from the Fu family he is part of a gang that kidnaps Fu Zi Xiang.

- Ivon Huang 黃雅珉 as Zhang Qian Lan 張倩蘭 - Age 52

Du Kai Qi's soft hearted mother and Fu Zi Jie's childhood nanny. Due to her husband's constantly harassing her boss for money she is forced to quit her job as Ah Jie's nanny leaving him lonely and without Kai Qi as a friend. When her deceased older daughter ex-boyfriend drops off his son Xiao Yi for her to raise, she gladly accepts without thinking of the financial burden and responsibilities it will bring for Kai Qi .

- Mason Zeng 曾柏崴 as Yan Xiao Yi 顏曉翼 - Age 6

Du Kai Qi's young nephew who is the son of her deceased older sister. His father abandons him to get remarried and start a new family without him. Ah Jie mistaken him to be Kai Qi's son when they first meet because he had accidentally called her mom. He soon becomes friends with Ah Jie. Ah Jie uses their friendship to get closer with Kai Qi.

=== Guest role ===
- Jacko Chiang 蔣偉文 as Enzo

Fu Zi Jie's friend and owner of the French restaurant that he had subbed as a chef under the name of Louis.

- Patrick Lee 李沛旭 as Food critic 美食雜誌主編

A food magazine writer that dined at "Figaro Cuisine". He is extremely nitpicking of his food.

- Lin Yi Xun 林奕勳 as Zhen Zhi Qiang 甄志強

A "Figaro Cuisine" customer who decides to cause trouble once he finds his ex-wife Lin Bao Zhu working as a waitress there.

- Sophia Lu 呂馥伶 as Kiki

Zhen Zhi Qiang's current wife who was his mistress and accountant whom he cheated with during his marriage to Bao Zhu.

- JR 紀言愷 as David Bu Da Wei 卜大衛

Judge at the cooking competition Du Kai Qi, Fu Zi Jie, Cheng Le Xuan and Ji Yong Qian complete in.

- Liu Xing 劉行 as Mr. Shun 順伯

Owner of the duck farm that Du Kai Qi and Fu Zi Jie go to get their duck for a cooking competition.

- Ralf Chiu 邱彥翔 as Bao Ge 豹哥

Wang Da Zhi's former triad boss who his ex-wife had left him for.

- Reina Ikehata 池端玲名 as Aiko 愛子

Wang Da Zhi's ex-wife who ask him for help when her current husband triad boss Bao Ge physically abuses her.

- Rex Kao 高允漢 as Ah Biao 阿標

One of Du Qing Shi's cohorts in kidnapping Fu Zi Xiang.

- Chen Wan Han 陳萬漢 as She Ji (Snake boy) 蛇仔

One of Du Qing Shi's cohorts in kidnapping Fu Zi Xiang.

- Double Lin 林家磑 as Benny

Fu Zi Jie's personal assistant when Ah Jie takes on as ShiFu Restaurant Corp General Manager during his brother's coma.

- Ian Chen as Xiang Yu 向宇

Food magazine writer and Cheng Hao Wei's friend who will help judge the competition between Ah Jie and Kai Qi's cook off.

- Livia Yin 尹嘉萱 as Blind date 相親女

Ji Yong Qian's matchmaking date. Le Xuan discovers that it is Yong Qian that she is in love with when she sees Yong Qian on a matchmaking date.

== Soundtrack ==
- Nobody And Princess 小人物大公主 by Ian Chen 陳彥允
- I’ll Always be here 隨時都在 by Victor Wong 品冠
- World Of Two People 兩人世界 by Alan Ko 柯有倫 & Huang Yali 黃雅莉
- Just Because 就因為 by Koala Liu 劉思涵
- Gene Says I Love You 基因決定我愛你 by Ian Chen 陳彥允
- Sleepless Happiness 幸福夜未眠 by Ian Chen 陳彥允
- The Glimmer In My Heart 心口的微光 by Sawmah Chen 陳詩妤
- Silently 默默 by Victor Wong 品冠
- Set You Free 還你自由 by Victor Wong 品冠

== Publications ==
Pleasantly Surprised Original Novel (喜歡一個人原創小說)
- Book cover image
- Author: Sanlih E-Television 三立電視監製; Li Wan Rong 李婉榕
- Genre: Fiction novel
- Published: 28 August 2014
- Publication place: Taiwan
- Media type: Print paperback
- Pages: 248
- ISBN: 9789863661115

- 28 Aug 2014 : Pleasantly Surprised Original Novel (喜歡一個人原創小說) - ISBN 9789863661115 - Author: Sanlih E-Television 三立電視監製 & Li Wan Rong 李婉榕 - Publisher: Taiwan Kadokawa 台灣角川

A novel based on the drama was published detailing the entire story line of the drama. Spoilers are revealed in the novel before the drama finished airing.

- 4 July 2014 : S-Pop Vol. 18 July 2014 (華流 7月號/2014) - barcode 4717095576124 - Author: Sanlih E-Television 三立電視監製

For the July 2014 issue of S-Pop magazine, two different covers were published with the lead actors of "Pleasantly Surprised" on the cover. Both covers has Jasper Liu and Puff Kuo in couple poses with different outfits. One is the regular newsstand edition and the other is a limited special edition that includes one out of four random poly folders with drama promotional images. The limited special edition also contains additional images not published in the regular version.

- 8 August 2014 : S-Pop Vol. 19 July 2014 (華流 8月號/2014) - barcode 4717095582248 - Author: Sanlih E-Television 三立電視監製

For the August 2014 issue of S-Pop magazine, three different covers were published with the lead actors and co-star Jolin Jian of "Pleasantly Surprised" on the cover. For the regular edition one cover featured Jasper Liu and the other Puff Kuo, for the limited special edition it features Liu, Kuo and Jian on the cover. The limited special edition also includes a one of two random cover notebooks with illustration artwork of the main leads on the front and back cover of the book.

- 24 July 2014 : Iwalker No.4 July/Aug 2014 (愛玩客 第4期/2014) - barcode 4717095572690 Sanlih 三立電視 - Author: Sanlih E-Television 三立電視監製

For the July/August 2014 issue of iwalker magazine, "Pleasantly Surprised" lead actors Jasper Liu and Puff Kuo are featured on the cover. The issue comes with one out of four heart shaped coasters with images of Liu or Kuo.

- 3 October 2014 : S-Pop Vol. 21 Oct 2014 (華流 10月號/2014) - barcode 4717095578616 - Author: Sanlih E-Television 三立電視監製

For the October 2014 issue of S-Pop magazine, one of three covers published was devoted to "Pleasantly Surprised" featuring both Jasper Liu and Puff Guo posing similar to the drama closing screen. The "Pleasantly Surprised" cover is the limited special edition of the October 2014 issue which comes with a mini tote bag with illustration artwork of the main characters.

== DVD release ==
- 25 December 2014 : Love Myself or You (DVD) (Taiwan Version) - DVD Region 3 - Disc: 6 (Ep.1-22) - Publisher: Cai Chang International Multimedia Inc. (TW)

Official Taiwan version of the drama DVD set comes in original Mandarin language and Chinese subtitles only.

- 13 February 2015 : Love Myself or You (DVD) (Malaysia Version) - DVD All Region - Disc: 7 (Ep.1-22) - Publisher: Multimedia Entertainment SDN. BHD. (MLY)

Malaysia version of the drama DVD set comes in original Mandarin language with English and simplified Chinese subtitles.

- 2 July 2015 : Love Myself or You (恋する、おひとり様) (Set 1 DVD) (Japan Version) - DVD Region 2 - Disc: 4 (Ep.1-7) - Publisher: NBC Universal Entertainment Japan (JP)

Japan version of the drama DVD set 1 comes in original Mandarin language with Japanese subtitles. Addition bonus feature includes Japanese trailer of the drama and cast interview of Jasper Liu and Jolin Chien. A 4 page leaflet detailing drama information is also inserted with the DVD set.

- 5 August 2015 : Love Myself or You (恋する、おひとり様) (Set 2 DVD) (Japan Version) - DVD Region 2 - Disc: 4 (Ep.8-14) - Publisher: NBC Universal Entertainment Japan (JP)

Japan version of the drama DVD set 2 comes in original Mandarin language with Japanese subtitles. Addition bonus feature includes cast interview of Puff Kuo and the 2014 Sanlih Drama Awards presentation. A 4 page leaflet detailing drama information is also inserted with the DVD set.

- 2 September 2015 : Love Myself or You (恋する、おひとり様) (Set 3 DVD) (Japan Version) - DVD Region 2 - Disc: 4 (Ep.15-22) - Publisher: NBC Universal Entertainment Japan (JP)

Japan version of the drama DVD set 3 comes in original Mandarin language with Japanese subtitles. Addition bonus feature includes Japan exclusive behind the scenes and cast makings of drama photage. A 4 page leaflet detailing drama information is also inserted with the DVD set.

== Filming locations ==
Pleasantly Surprised was filmed entirely in Taiwan. The French restaurant "Figaro Cuisine" depicted in the drama is an actual Italian restaurant named "Buono Bella", located in Hsinchu City, Taiwan. During filming of the drama the restaurant would close on Monday's for the cast and crew to film without disturbance. The residence of where both main characters reside at is an actual newly built condo tower located in Hsinchu City, Taiwan near Zhiping Rd, East District called Hsinchu Infinity 新竹大無限. The opening and closing sequence of the drama was filmed at Nanliao Port and outside of the Glass Museum of Hsinchu City.

=== Taipei, Taiwan ===
- Beitou District
  - The Gaia Hotel 大地北投奇岩溫泉酒店
- Daan District
  - Façön French Restaurant 法熊法式餐廳
  - Sperry Top-Sider 台北忠孝概念店
- Neihu District
  - Cha Cha Cafe' & Bistro
  - Dahu Park 大湖公園
  - Mastro Cafe
  - Potager Garden 菠啾花園
  - Carrefour
- Songshan District
  - Yamaharu Japanese Restaurant 山治日本鄉下料理店
  - Tokyo Aquarium Design 東京水族設計
- Xinyi District
  - Zheng Yan Ting Video & Book Rental 政大展燕庭影音租書店
  - Songde Park 松德公園
- Zhonghe District
  - Global Mall 環球購物中心
- Zhongshan District
  - Yingfeng Riverside Park 迎風河濱公園
  - ARTCO CLASSIQUE 典藏藝術餐廳
  - Pâtisserie Francis 旋轉木馬點
  - Shuei Wu 水舞饌大直店
  - ISLA for Kids
- Zhongzheng District
  - Taipei Botanical Garden
  - Nanmen Market 南門市場

=== Hsinchu, Taiwan ===
- Hsinchu City
  - Buono Bella Italian Restaurant
  - Nanliao Port
  - Sagor Bilingual School
  - Hsinchu Infinity 新竹大無限
  - Lakeshore Hotel Hsinchu
  - Sun-View Motel 湖山風景旅館
  - Glass Museum of Hsinchu City
  - KEEP Sport 棒壘球打擊場

=== New Taipei City, Taiwan ===
- Shenkeng District
  - Tungnan University 東南科技大學
- Sanxia District
  - Cheng Hok Senior Home清福養老院老人長期照護中心
  - Chengfu Mine 成福煤礦

=== Taoyuan County, Taiwan ===
- Taoyuan City
  - Min-Sheng General Hospital 敏盛綜合醫院

=== Pingtung County, Taiwan ===
- Pingtung County
  - National Museum of Marine Biology and Aquarium

=== T'Ai-Wan, Taiwan ===
- Neiwen
  - Forest Mountain Hostel 山居森活

== Development and casting ==
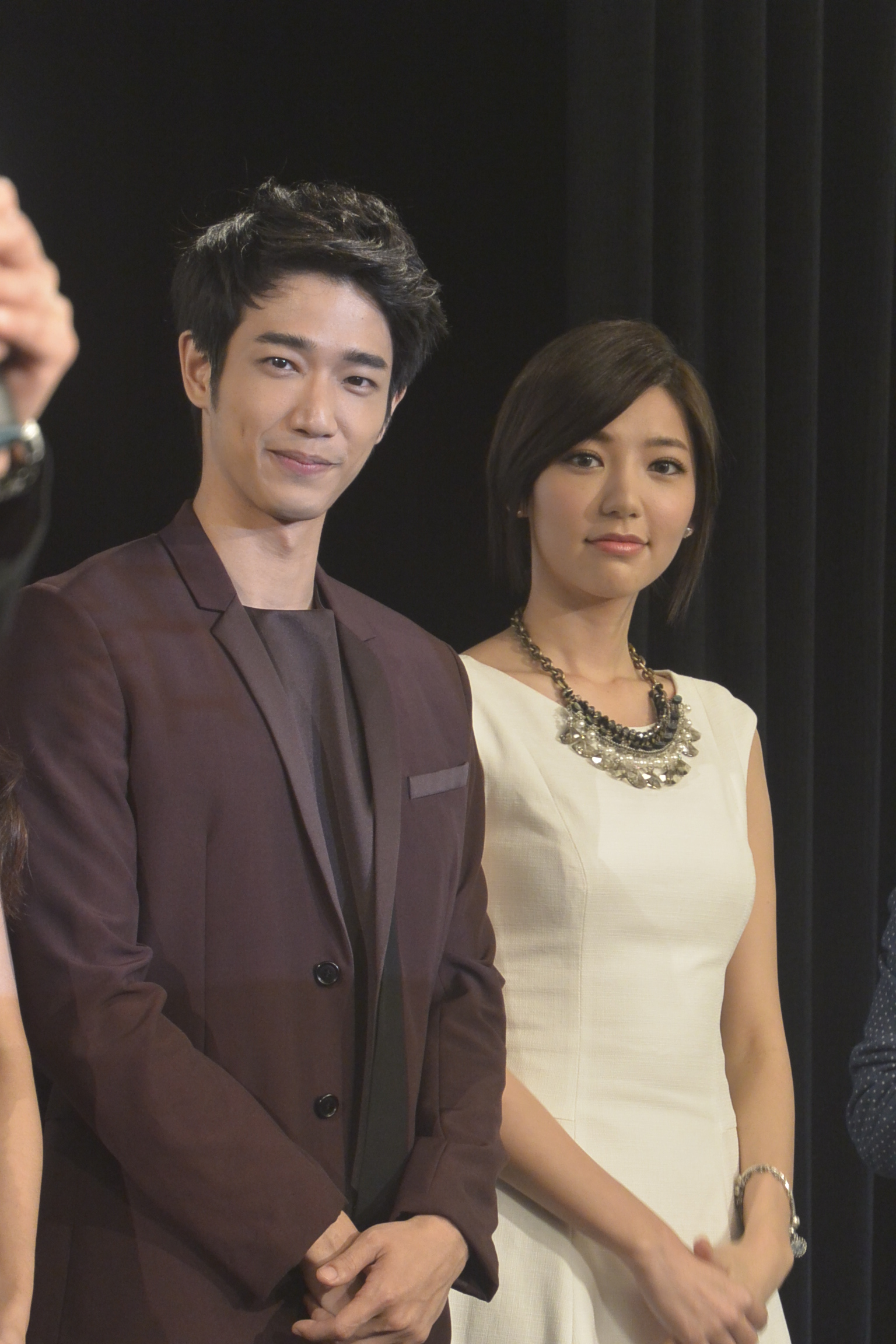
Jasper Liu and Puff Kuo at "Pleasantly Surprised" press conference on May 21, 2014.

- Annie Chen was offered the lead actress role in February 2014 during early developments of the drama, but turned it down to concentrate on modeling and advertisement work instead. Also, to let her contract with Sanlih expire without renewing it.
- This is Jasper Liu's first collaboration with Sanlih. Rumors that he will be starring in a future Sanlih drama first started circulating when he appeared on the cover of Sanlih's self-published S-Pop magazine October 2013 issue.
- Jasper Liu cropped off his famous curly locks, which had made him a popular male model, in order to go for a more mature look in the drama.
- Puff Kuo had turned down the lead actress role in Fall in Love with Me (which eventually went to her bandmate Tia Lee) in order to participate in We Got Married Global Edition which was filmed in South Korea, however a month after turning down the lead role in Fall in Love with Me she agreed to take on the lead actress role of "Du Kai Qi" in Pleasantly Surprised when offered to her. Kuo would travel back and forth between South Korea and Taiwan until late June 2014 when the reality show finished filming since both the reality show and drama was filmed at the same time.
- Jasper Liu and Puff Kuo first met and collaborated in a short comic skit at the 2013 Golden Bell Awards, ironically playing a romantic idol couple.
- The opening lens and blessing ceremony was held at SETTV headquarters main entrance on April 22, 2014.
- A press conference was held on April 23, 2014, at SETTV headquarters lobby in Neihu District, Taipei introducing the main leads of the drama.
- On May 21, 2014, another press conference was held at SETTV headquarters auditorium introducing the extended cast of the drama.
- The drama wrap up party was held at Yun Fu Lou Restaurant 永福樓 located in Daan District, Taipei on the evening of October 13, 2014.

== Events ==
*Date: 10 May 2014 - Location: Zhongzheng District, Taipei - Attendees: Jasper Liu, In a Good Way cast

Jasper Liu attended the goodbye fan meeting for exiting drama In a Good Way outside of the Siyuan Street 7-11 to promote Pleasantly Surprised taking over the timeslot of the exiting drama.

*Date: 22 May 2014 - Location: Neihu District, Taipei - Attendees: Jasper Liu, Puff Kuo, Jolin Chien, Lene Lai

The main leads and main supporting leads attended a live filming of entertainment news show New Show Biz located at Sanlih's headquarters. The cast members played interactive games with the show hosts and randomly picked audience members.

*Date: 4 June 2014 - Location: Neihu District, Taipei - Attendees: Jasper Liu, Puff Kuo, Jolin Chien, Lene Lai, Sean Lee, Yorke Sun, Stanley Mei, Deyn Li, Mason Zeng

The male cast members exposed their upper bodies in keeping with Jasper Liu's promise to go topless if the drama surpasses the 2.00 rating average. The event was held at Sanlih headquarters rooftop garden. A water gun fight was held between the male cast and the two main female cast members before all the male cast took off their shirts.

*Date: 10 July 2014 - Location: Neihu District, Taipei - Attendees: Jasper Liu, Jolin Chien, Sean Lee, Yorke Sun

A fan meet and great was held at Sanlih's headquarters auditorium attended by four of the male cast members. Besides meeting and greeting the attended cast members also played interactive games with randomly chosen audience members.

*Date: 13 July 2014 - Location: Neihu District, Taipei - Attendees: Jasper Liu, Puff Kuo

A fan signing for the July 2014 issues of S-Pop magazine was held at Sanlih's headquarters auditorium. The two main leads posed for pictures and interacted with randomly chosen audience members.

*Date: 16 August 2014 - Location: Hsinchu City, Taiwan - Attendees: Jolin Chien, Lene Lai, Sean Lee, Yorke Sun, Stanley Mei, Deyn Li

Members of the cast met with fans outside of the Hsinchu City's Glass Museum. Interactive games were played with randomly picked audiences. A handshake meet and greet was held for all fans who attended the event.

*Date: 24 August 2014 - Location: Hsinchu City, Taiwan - Attendees: Jasper Liu, Jolin Chien

A fan signing for the August 2014 issue of S-Pop magazine was held outside of Hsinchu City Sogo department store. Liu and Chien posed for pictures before signing their autographs for fans.

*Date: 1 October 2014 - Location: Neihu District, Taipei - Attendees: Jasper Liu, Jolin Chien, Lene Lai, Sean Lee, Ba Yu, Yorke Sun, Verna Lin, Stanley Mei, Zooey Tseng, Deyn Li

The cast attended a recording of entertainment news show New Show Biz located in Sanlih's headquarters that was aired on October 10, 2014 to promote the final episodes of the drama. Games were played within the cast members and hosts of the show.

*Date: 11 October 2014 - Location: Neihu District, Taipei - Attendees: Jasper Liu, Puff Kuo, Jolin Chien, Lene Lai, Sean Lee, Ba Yu, Yorke Sun, Verna Lin, Stanley Mei, Zooey Tseng, Deyn Li, Vic Chen, Mason Zeng

A goodbye fan meeting event was held at Sanlih's headquarters auditorium, attended by most of the cast. Puff Kuo who had other work commitments was only able to attend the later half of the event. Interactive games and prizes were given to randomly selected audience members. At the end a high five meet and greet was held for all fans who attended the event.

== Broadcast ==
| Network | Country | Airing Date | Timeslot |
|---|---|---|---|
| SETTV | Taiwan | May 23, 2014 | Friday 10:00-11:30 pm |
| ETTV | Taiwan | May 24, 2014 | Saturday 8:00-9:30 pm |
| LTV | Taiwan | June 15, 2015 | Monday to Friday 7:00-8:55 pm |
| Astro AEC | Malaysia | June 22, 2014 | Monday to Friday 4:00–5:00 pm |
| Astro Quan Jia HD | Malaysia | November 24, 2014 | Sunday to Thursday 10:00 am–12:00 pm |
| StarHub TV | Singapore | June 22, 2014 | Sunday 10:00-11:30 pm |
| Amarin TV | Thailand | March 8, 2015 | Saturday & Sunday 2:00-3:30 pm |
| So-net | Japan | May 31, 2015 | Saturday & Sunday 8:00-9:00 pm |
| TVB Chinese Drama | Hong Kong | July 4, 2015 | Saturday 1:00-2:55 pm |

== Episode ratings ==
Competing dramas on rival channels airing at the same time slot were:
- TTV - Apple in Your Eye, Prince William
- SET - Once Upon a Time in Beitou, Our Mother
- FTV - Independent Heroes
- CTS - Lovestore at the Corner
- CTV - God's Gift: 14 Days, My Love from the Star

| Air Date | Episode | Average Ratings | Rank | Note |
|---|---|---|---|---|
| May 23, 2014 | 1 | 1.15 | 2 | |
| May 30, 2014 | 2 | 1.52 | 1 | CTV《My Love from the Star》 starts airing |
| June 6, 2014 | 3 | 1.56 | 1 | |
| June 13, 2014 | 4 | 1.83 | 1 | |
| June 20, 2014 | 5 | 1.79 | 1 | |
| June 27, 2014 | 6 | 1.82 | 1 | |
| July 4, 2014 | 7 | 2.03 | 1 | |
| July 11, 2014 | 8 | 1.61 | 2 | |
| July 18, 2014 | 9 | 1.54 | 2 | CTV《God's Gift: 14 Days》 starts airing |
| July 25, 2014 | 10 | 1.75 | 2 | |
| August 1, 2014 | 11 | 1.67 | 2 | TTV《Prince William》final episode |
| August 8, 2014 | 12 | 1.83 | 2 | SET《Once Upon a Time in Beitou》final episode TTV《Apple in Your Eye》starts airing |
| August 15, 2014 | 13 | 1.77 | 2 | SET 《Our Mother》starts airing |
| August 22, 2014 | 14 | 1.60 | 2 | |
| August 29, 2014 | 15 | 1.36 | 2 | |
| September 5, 2014 | 16 | 1.30 | 2 | |
| September 12, 2014 | 17 | 1.42 | 2 | |
| September 19, 2014 | 18 | 1.45 | 2 | |
| September 26, 2014 | 19 | 1.38 | 2 | |
| October 3, 2014 | 20 | 1.24 | 2 | |
| October 10, 2014 | 21 | 1.24 | 3 | CTS 《Lovestore at the Corner》final episode |
| October 17, 2014 | 22 | 1.61 | 2 | 《Pleasantly Surprised》 final episode |
| Average ratings | | 1.57 | | |

== Awards and nominations ==
| Year | Ceremony | Category | Nominee | Result |
|---|---|---|---|---|
| 2014 | 2014 Sanlih Drama Awards 華劇大賞 | Best Actor Award | Jasper Liu | Nominated |
| 2014 | 2014 Sanlih Drama Awards 華劇大賞 | Best Actress Award | Puff Kuo | Nominated |
| 2014 | 2014 Sanlih Drama Awards 華劇大賞 | Best Screen Couple Award | Jasper Liu & Puff Kuo | Nominated |
| 2014 | 2014 Sanlih Drama Awards 華劇大賞 | Best Kiss Award | Jasper Liu & Puff Kuo | Won |
| 2014 | 2014 Sanlih Drama Awards 華劇大賞 | Best Crying Award | Jasper Liu & Puff Kuo | Nominated |
| 2014 | 2014 Sanlih Drama Awards 華劇大賞 | Best Foolishly Award | Hu Pei-Lian | Won |
| 2014 | 2014 Sanlih Drama Awards 華劇大賞 | China Wave Award | Jasper Liu | Nominated |
| 2014 | 2014 Sanlih Drama Awards 華劇大賞 | China Wave Award | Puff Kuo | Won |
| 2014 | 2014 Sanlih Drama Awards 華劇大賞 | Weibo Popularity Award | Jasper Liu | Nominated |
| 2014 | 2014 Sanlih Drama Awards 華劇大賞 | Weibo Popularity Award | Puff Kuo | Nominated |
| 2014 | 2014 Sanlih Drama Awards 華劇大賞 | Viewers Choice Drama Award | Pleasantly Surprised | Nominated |
