= Apple in Your Eye =

Taiwanese television series

- Promotional poster
- Also known as: 妹妹
- Written by: Mag Hsu
- Directed by: Chen Rong Hui
- Starring: Lan Cheng-lung; Amber An; Christina Mok; An He
- Opening theme: Gone (走了) by Luan Tan A Xiang
- Ending theme: New home (新宿) by Amber An
- Country of origin: Taiwan
- Original language: Mandarin
- No. of seasons: 1
- No. of episodes: 13

Production
- Production location: Taiwan
- Running time: 90 minutes

Original release
- Network: TTV Main Channel
- Release: 8 August – 31 October 2014

Apple in Your Eye (Chinese: 妹妹; pinyin: Mèimei) is a 2014 Taiwanese television series. The series was produced by Qinai Studio Ltd. It stars Lan Cheng-lung, Amber An, Christina Mok and An He as the main leads. It was first aired on August 8, 2014 on TTV Main Channel after Prince William. The 13th and final episode aired on November 7, 2014.

== Synopsis ==
The Zhou family has high hopes in giving birth to a son, but was disappointed when Zhou Ji Wei was born a girl, making her the third daughter in line. Because she was a disappointment to the family, she was only ever given hand me downs from her sisters. She felt no love from her family, but luckily she feels the love of a family from her neighbor especially Dai Nai Nai. There she meets her 'brother' Dai Yao Qi and follows him around trying to be the best sister ever, however he has never wanted to have a sister. As she tries her best to be close to him as his sister, she slowly realizes the feelings she holds for him are not love for a brother but something more.

== Cast ==
=== Main cast ===
- Lan Cheng-lung as Dai Yao Qi
- Amber An as Zhou Ji Wei
- Christina Mok as Fang Shao Min
- An He as Yuan Fang

=== Extended cast ===
- Wu Ding Qian as A Bin
- Lai Pei Ying as Zhou Ji Xuan
- Patty Wu as Chou Chi-ju
- Li Zheng Da as Li Zheng
- Zhou Ming Fu as A Guang
- Zhang Ting Hu as Xiao Se
- Liu Lu Cun as Xiao Suang
- Yang Xiao Jun as Xiao Feng
- Bamboo Chen as Chou Chi-ju's fiancé
- Lin Mei-hsiu as Mei
- Winnie Chang as A&Z employee
- Hsia Ching Ting
- Phoebe Huang
- Wu Ding Qian
- Ding Ye Tian
- Jag Huang as San-mi (Chou Kuan-hsiung)
- Zhong Xin Ling

== Broadcast ==
Channel	Country	Broadcast date	Timeslot
TTV/TTV HD	Taiwan	August 8, 2014	Friday 10:00-11:30 pm
GTV	Taiwan	August 9, 2014	Saturday 10:00-11:30 pm
8TV	Malaysia	August 9, 2014	Saturday 6:30-8:00 pm
Channel U	Singapore	August 30, 2014	Saturday 9:00-11:30 pm
KTSF	United States	December 2, 2014	Monday to Friday 9:00-10:00 pm
TVB Korean Drama	Hong Kong	January 8, 2015	Monday to Friday 12:30-1:30 pm
LA18 TV	United States	January 18, 2015	Monday to Friday 09:00-10:00 pm
Asia Dramatic TV	Japan	March 21, 2015	
TVBS	Taiwan	March 25, 2015	Monday to Friday 20:00-21:00 pm

== Episode ratings ==
Competing dramas on rival channels airing at the same time slot were:

- SETTV – Pleasantly Surprised
- SET - Once Upon a Time in Beitou, Our Mother
- FTV - Independent Heroes
- CTS - Lovestore at the Corner
- CTV – God's Gift – 14 Days

Air Date	Episode	Average Ratings	Rank
August 8, 2014	1	0.82	4
August 15, 2014	2	0.60	4
August 22, 2014	3	0.84	4
August 29, 2014	4	0.82	4
September 5, 2014	5	0.89	4
September 12, 2014	6	1.05	4
September 19, 2014	7	0.87	4
September 26, 2014	8	0.90	4
October 3, 2014	9	0.86	4
October 10, 2014	10	1.30	2
October 17, 2014	11	1.13	2
October 24, 2014	12	1.24	2
October 31, 2014	13	1.29	2
Average ratings		0.97	

== Awards and nominations ==
Year	Ceremony	Category	Nominee	Result
2015	50th Golden Bell Awards	Best Television Series	Apple in Your Eye	Nominated
2015	50th Golden Bell Awards	Best Actor	Lan Cheng-lung	Won
2015	50th Golden Bell Awards	Best Directing	Chen Rong Hui	Nominated
2015	50th Golden Bell Awards	Best Writing	Mag Hsu	Nominated
