= Museum of Glass (disambiguation) =

The Museum of Glass may be:

- Corning Museum of Glass, Corning, New York, US
- Museum of Glass, Tacoma, Washington, US
- The New Bedford Museum of Glass, New Bedford, Massachusetts, US
- Turner Museum of Glass, Sheffield, UK

== See also ==
- Glass Museum (disambiguation)
