= Prince William (TV series) =

- Promo poster
- Also known as: Wei Lian Wang Zi
- 威廉王子
- Genre: Romance, Comedy
- Created by: Taiwan Television TTV
- Written by: Chen Hui Ru 陳慧如
- Directed by: Huang Tian Ren 黃天仁
- Starring: KunDa Hsieh; Andrea Chen; An Wei Ling; Gu Bao Ming; Paul Hsu
- Opening theme: Prince's DNA (王子的DNA) by Antonio Huang
- Ending theme: Invisible Man (影形人) by Antonio Huang
- Country of origin: Republic of China (Taiwan)
- Original languages: Mandarin; Hokkien
- No. of series: 1
- No. of episodes: 14

Production
- Producer: Pan Yi Qun 潘逸群
- Production location: Taiwan
- Running time: 90 minutes
- Production company: Bethel Production Company 伯特利影像製作有限公司

Original release
- Network: TTV, TTV HD
- Release: 26 April – 2 August 2014

Related
- CHOCOLAT 流氓蛋糕店; Apple in Your Eye 妹妹

Prince William (Chinese: 威廉王子; pinyin: Wei Lian Wang Zi) is a 2014 Taiwanese romantic-comedy television drama created and produced by TTV, starring KunDa Hsieh (playing dual roles) and Andrea Chen as the main leads with Gu Bao Ming, Paul Hsu and An Wei Ling in main supporting roles. The title is in reference to one of the main characters who is named William and acts as if he is above all, which results in others questioning if William "thinks he is a prince". The drama began filming in February 2014 and finished in June 2014, it was filmed while it aired. Original first broadcast began on April 26, 2014, during TTV's standard and HD channels 10:00–11:30 p.m. timeslot airing every Friday night and final episode airing on August 2, 2014, with 14 episodes total.

== Synopsis ==
A poor and lowly educated fishmonger with a carefree happy attitude is forced to take on the identity of a cold ruthless real-estate developer when his home that has been in his family for three generations is at stake. However it won't be as simple as just having the same face when a subordinate with the help of a reporter tries to sabotage him, a sister that butts heads with him, his mother questioning him about his new job and then having regrets of ever agreeing to taking on the life of the real-estate developer when his conscience gets the better of him.

== Plot summary ==
Liu Wen Bin or Ah Bin as everyone in the fishing village of Mei calls him, is a carefree happy fishmonger who lives with his widowed mother. His simple peaceful life is turned upside down when the CEO of Yi Shan Constructions, Yi Wei Lian or William as he is called, arrives at Mei Village looking to tear it down and build a posh seaside resort called Bella Villa. Their path crosses while using the restroom at the same time, Ah Bin is mistaken as William by kidnappers who are working together with William's chauffeur. The chauffeur realizing his cohorts have the wrong person detours around Mei Village to have the correct William kidnapped.

Ah Bin escapes and reports the incident to the police where they contact William's personal assistant. At the police station Ah Bin meets William's mentor Wan Yong Chang and personal assistant Ma Ka Long. Wan and Maka are surprised and shocked by Ah Bin's uncanny resemblance to William, the only way to tell them apart is a mole on William's left cheek. Wan uses guilt and pity on Ah Bin to have him pretend to be William in order to help save William. What was supposed to be a one time role play job turns into long term when William is over traumatized after he has been rescued and unable to function. Ah Bin refuses to pretend to be William long term but Wan uses his family home as blackmail to coax him into agreeing. With his home at stake Ah Bin hesitantly agrees to pretend to be William while William recovers, in exchange Wan promises that Yi Shan Constructions will spare his home from the Bella Villa renewal project demolition at Mei Village.

To make sure Ah Bin and William do not have any relations to each other Wan and Maka secretly have Ah Bin's DNA tested. However it won't be easy on Ah Bin with just having the same face and learning William's mannerism when the General Manager of Yi Shan who constantly feels disrespected by William works together with a reporter to sabotage William and see that he fails as CEO. Then Ah Bin falls in love at first sight with William's younger sister Yi Xin, who constantly disagrees with the way William runs his company. With Ah Bin and Xin living together alone he sometimes forgets that he is supposed to be a brother to her and not have romantic thoughts about her. Things get further complicated when Ah Bin finds out that documents he has been signing in William's signature are to evict and demolish homes of elderly people who will become homeless. Having regrets and unable to control his conscience Ah Bin starts to rebel against Wan and do things his own way.

When the real William finds out that someone has been running Yi Shan Constructions in his place he goes ballistic and starts to turn against all those that care for him. Feeling betrayed and tricked he fires Wan, questions if his sister Xin really thinks of him as a blood relative and tries to overturn the contract that protects Ah Bin's home from demolition. William further goes into delusion when he feels under appreciated and thinking Ah Bin will replace him he accidentally hurts Ah Bin's mother, who was the only person that had actually given him a mothers security and love that he had longed for all his life. Realizing his wrongs William ask Ah Bin to help him regain Yi Shan Constructions board members trust by coming clean about having Ah Bin pretend to be him in the past and also naming Ah Bin as acting CEO of Yi Shan while he is away to further recover.

== Cast ==
=== Main cast ===
- KunDa Hsieh 謝坤達 as Yi Wei Lian 易威廉 / Liu Wen Bin 劉文彬

Liu Wen Bin 劉文彬 - He is called Ah Bin by everyone. A poor fishmonger that lives with his widowed mother in the small seaside fishing village of Mei. He leads a peaceful and carefree life until his home that has been in his family for three generations is up for demolition by Yi Shan Constructions to build a new seaside resort call Bella Villa. In order to save his home he agrees to assume the identity of William the unstable CEO of Yi Shan Constructions. But things get complicated when he falls in love with William's sister Yi Xin and starts to rebel on William's mentor Wan because his conscience gets the better of him.
Yi Wei Lian 易威廉 - He is referred to as William. The cold and ruthless rich CEO of Yi Shan Constructions. He recently took over his deceased father's company but has panic attacks due to the pressures of being an inexperience CEO. A kidnapping orchestrated by his own mother and one of her boyfriends when he was young has left him traumatized for the rest of his childhood and left him with mental issues. Unable to trust anyone he puts on a cold persona when dealing with people. After another kidnapping orchestrated by his chauffeur he is left over traumatized and unable to function.

- Andrea Chen 陳匡怡 as Yi Xin 易欣

William's younger sister who just graduated from college and works as an independent journalist. She writes for her own blog called Liberté. She does not agree with how William runs Yi Shan Constructions and constantly argues with him about evicting people and demolishing their homes. Ah Bin falls in love with her at first sight and sometimes forgets that Xin is William's sister. Unlike other rich girls she is not into makeup, jewelry or clothing. When she finds out about Ah Bin she starts to know him and fall for him after seeing his caring and big heart for others.

- An Wei Ling 安唯綾 as Zhao Kai Di 趙凱蒂

She is referred to as Katy by everyone. Zhao Da Hai's daughter. Yi Xin's former classmate who she does not get along with. She has been in love with William since they were young, which her father does not understand since he finds William annoying. She works at Yi Shan Constructions as her father's assistant, Song's assistant. She spreads rumors about her and William who was really Ah Bin to gossip reporters in order to try to cement her status as William's girlfriend.

- Ku Pao-ming as Wan Yong Chang 萬永昌

William's father former trusted assistant. He was tasked by William's late father to mentor and protect William. In order to hide William's mental illness and protect his image he blackmails Ah Bin with his home at stake into assuming William's identity while William recovers in secrecy. In order to fulfill his former boss's dying wish he neglects his daughter and ailing wife's wish to retire and be with the family more.

- Paul Hsu 許騰方 as Ma Ka Long 馬卡隆

William's personal assistant. He was with William during his kidnapping at Mei Village and is the only other person besides Wan that knows of Ah Bin assuming William's identity. In order to maintain his job he constantly keeps tabs on Ah Bin to make sure he won't do anything out of the ordinary. He becomes friends with Ah Bin who has become a kinder and friendlier boss to him than the real William ever was.

=== Supporting cast ===
- Zhu De Gang 朱德剛 as Zhao Da Hai 趙大海

General Manager at Yi Shan Constructions and Katy's father. Feeling disrespected by William he works together with reporter Fang Yun Hao to sabotage William and makes sure his first major project as the CEO fails. He often uses history figures and war leaders during his speeches to William to intimidate him.

- Jason Zou 鄒承恩 as Fang Yun Hao 方允浩

A well known journalist. He works together with Zhao Da Hai to try to sabotage William. When he gets hold of information about Ah Bin he investigate Ah Bin's connection with William and tries to uncover the truth between them.

- Pan Li Li 潘麗麗 as Lai Yu Xia 賴玉霞

Ah Bin's loving and caring widowed mother. She is saddened and suspicious when her son who has never cared for big city life suddenly leaves their fishing village to take a job in Taipei, but little does she know that he is only doing so to protect their home.

- Xu Hao Xiang 徐灝翔 as Assistant Song 宋祕書

Zhao Da Hai's trusted assistant. His boss's daughter Katy works as his assistant.

- Zhang You Ming 張佑鳴 as Ke Sang 柯桑

A fellow village residence at Mei Village that are friends with Ah Bin and his mother.

- Gou Feng 勾峰 as Yi Ming Shan 易明山

William and Xin's deceased father. He died recently due to cancer leaving William to take over his company. His dying wish to Wan is for him to protect and mentor William.

- Liao Yi Qiao 廖苡喬 as Xiao Tong 小瞳

Yi Xin's friend.

- Yao Kun Jun 姚坤君 as Psychiatrist 心理醫生

A psychiatrist that is treating William's mental illness.

- Xia He Xi 夏和熙 as Hairstylist 髮型師

The stylist that Wan hires to give Ah Bin a makeover in order to look like William.

- Wang Xi Hua 王希華 as Director Wang 王部長

Works at Yi Shan Constructions. He is in charge of the budget for each construction project.

- Huang Wan Bo 黃萬伯 as Police officer Lin 小林

The police officer that was in charge of Ah Bin's kidnapping case. According to himself he has gone through professional training.

- Ray Yu 尉庭愷 as young William Yi 小威廉

He was a normal child until his own mother together with her boyfriend who she plans on running away with orchestrate a kidnapping plan to extort money with William's life.

- Gina Lin 林利霏 as Wan Xiao Qing 萬小晴

Wan Yong Chang's grown daughter. She goes to Yi Shan Constructions headquarters demanding her father retire before its too late due to her ailing mother who is suffers from dementia.

== Soundtrack ==
Prince William Original TV Soundtrack (OST)

Soundtrack album by Various artists
- Released: 23 May 2014
- Genre: Mandopop
- Language: Mandarin
- Labels: Millions Entertainment Co., Ltd. 米樂士娛樂

Prince William Original TV Soundtrack (OST) (威廉王子 電視劇原聲帶) was released on 23 May 2014, by various artists under Millions Entertainment Co., Ltd. label. It contains 16 tracks total, in which 6 songs are various instrumental and karaoke versions of the songs. The opening theme is track 1 "Prince's DNA 王子的DNA" performed by Antonio Huang, while the closing theme is track 2 "Invisible Man 影形人" also by Antonio Huang.

=== Track listing ===
No.	Title	Singer(s)	Length
1.	"Prince's DNA" (王子的DNA)	Antonio Huang 黃宥傑	2:52
2.	"Invisible Man" (影形人)	Antonio Huang 黃宥傑	5:13
3.	"Frozen Love" (冰凍愛情)	Jack Yao 姚可傑	4:08
4.	"Came Away Forgotten" (來了走了忘了)	Canace Wu 亦帆	4:43
5.	"Prince's DNA (rock ver)" (王子的 DNA (rock 版))	Antonio Huang 黃宥傑	1:27
6.	"Invisible Man" (影形人)	Instrumental	5:12
7.	"Frozen Love (feelings hurt ver)" (冰凍愛情 (傷愛懸情版))	Jack Yao 姚可傑	3:02
8.	"Came Away Forgotten" (來了走了忘了)	Instrumental	4:42
9.	"Prince's DNA (piano ver)" (王子的 DNA (低迴沉思鋼琴版))	Antonio Huang 黃宥傑	2:45
10.	"Invisible Man (memories ver)" (影形人 (輕閉雙眼回憶版))	Antonio Huang 黃宥傑	2:39
11.	"Prince's DNA (music box ver)" (王子的 DNA (寂靜長夜Music Box版))	Antonio Huang 黃宥傑	1:42
12.	"Invisible Man (crystal ver))" (影形人(晶瑩琉璃音樂盒版))	Antonio Huang 黃宥傑	2:29
13.	"Prince's DNA (Karaoke ver)" (王子的 DNA (Karaoke ver))	Instrumental	2:53
14.	"Invisible Man (Karaoke ver)" (影形人 (Karaoke ver))	Instrumental	5:12
15.	"Frozen Love (Karaoke ver)" (冰凍愛情 (Karaoke ver))	Instrumental	4:05
16.	"Came Away Forgotten (Karaoke ver)" (來了走了忘了(Karaoke ver))	Instrumental	4:46

== Broadcast ==
Channel	Country	Broadcast date	Timeslot
TTV/TTV HD	Taiwan	April 24, 2014	Friday 10:00-11:30 p.m.
GTV	Taiwan	April 26, 2014	Saturday 10:00-11:35 p.m.

== Episode ratings ==
Competing dramas on rival channels airing at the same time slot were:

- SETTV - In a Good Way, Pleasantly Surprised
- SET - Once Upon a Time in Beitou
- FTV - Independent Heroes
- CTS - Lovesoter at the Corner
- CTV - God's Gift: 14 Days, My Love from the Star

Air Date	Episode	Average Ratings	Rank
April 25, 2014	1	0.44	4
May 2, 2014	2	0.48	4
May 9, 2014	3	0.53	4
May 16, 2014	4	0.54	4
May 23, 2014	5	0.61	3
May 30, 2014	6	0.53	5
June 6, 2014	7	0.66	5
June 13, 2014	8	0.66	5
June 20, 2014: No episode was aired due to TTV airing of "25th Golden Melody Awards"
June 27, 2014	9	0.53	5
July 4, 2014	10	0.67	5
July 11, 2014	11	0.46	5
July 18, 2014	12	0.58	4
July 25, 2014	13	0.59	4
August 1, 2014	14	0.53	4
Average ratings		0.56	
