= Glass Museum of Hsinchu City =

Museum in East, Hsinchu City, Taiwan

- 新竹市立玻璃工藝博物館
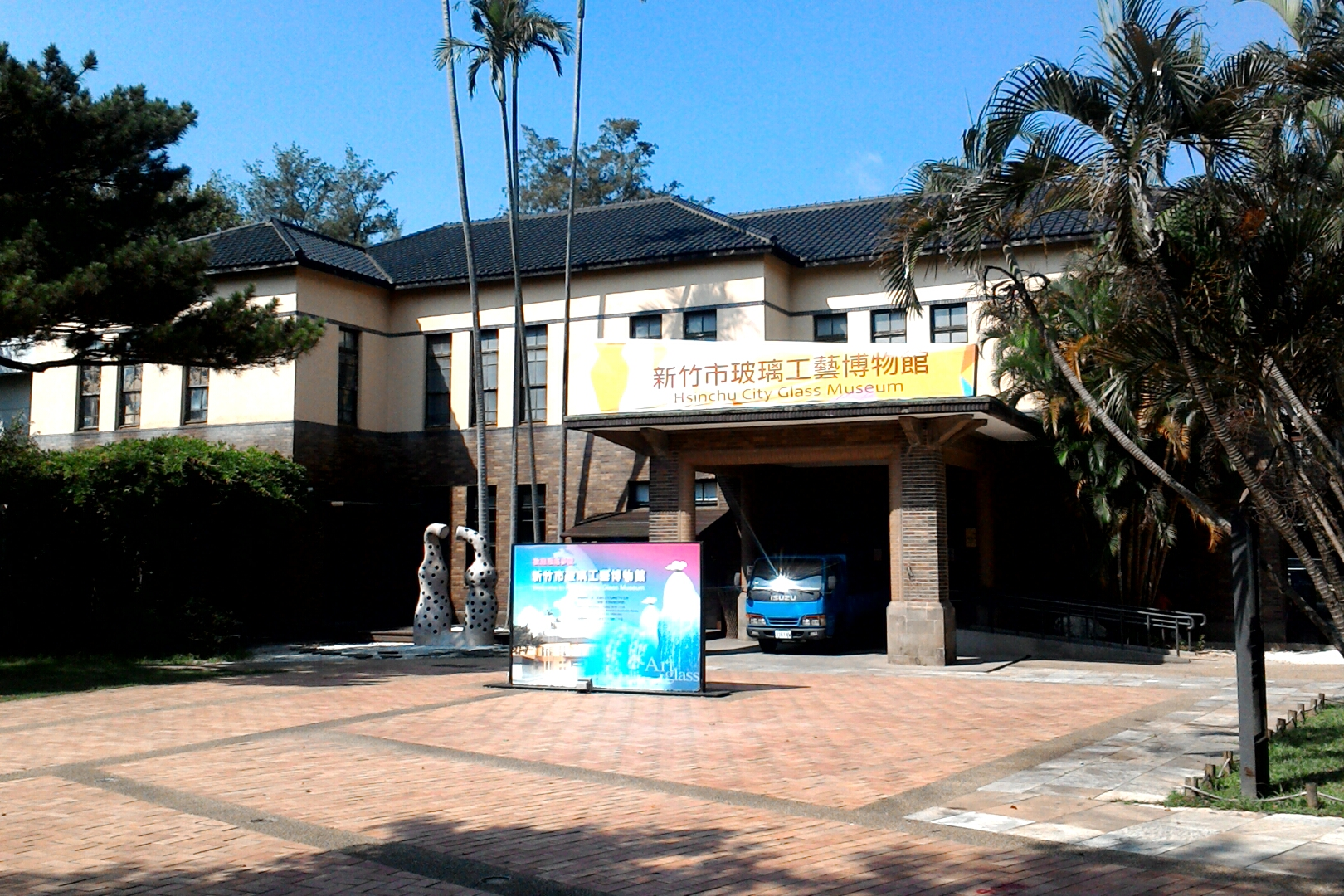
- Established: 18 December 1999
- Location: East, Hsinchu City, Taiwan
- Coordinates: 24°48′05″N 120°58′41″E
- Type: museum
- Architects: Chi Tieh-nan, Chen Kuo-ning

The Glass Museum of Hsinchu City (traditional Chinese: 新竹市立玻璃工藝博物館; simplified Chinese: 新竹市立玻璃工艺博物馆; pinyin: Xīnzhú Shìlì Bōlí Gōngyì Bówùguǎn; Wade–Giles: Hsin^{1}-chu^{2} Shih^{4}-li^{4} Po^{1}-li^{2} Kung^{1}-i^{4} Po^{2}-wu^{4}-kuan^{3}) is a museum of glass art in East District, Hsinchu City, Taiwan.

== History ==
The museum building was originally constructed in 1936 for lodging and resting of Japanese royal family and government officials when they visit Taiwan. The building was converted into the Glass Museum of Hsinchu City on 18 December 1999.

== Objectives ==
The museum has the following objectives:

- Combine cultural and sightseeing resources to help promoting the glass industry of Hsinchu
- Let the public and business personnel participate in and understand the exploration and application of the glass industry in Hsinchu

== Architecture ==
The museum building retains its European style of oriental modern architecture through the standing bricks on the southeast corner of the building and the classical image of the foyer.

== Service functions ==
The museum has the following functions:

- Administration
- Exhibition
- Collection
- Educational learning
- Public service

== Transportation ==
The museum is accessible within walking distance east from Hsinchu Station of Taiwan Railway.

== See also ==
- List of museums in Taiwan
