= Zhuzhong =

Zhuzhong may refer to:

- Zhuzhong railway station, a railway station of the Taiwan Railways Administration
- Zhuzhong Village (竹中里), Changhua, Changhua County, Taiwan Province, Republic of China
- Zhuzhong Village (竹中里), Cianjhen District, Kaohsiung, Republic of China
- Pang Zhuzhong (庞柱中), one of the CPC Party secretaries of Ningxiang
