= Politics of Ningxiang =

The Politics of Ningxiang in Hunan province in the People's Republic of China is structured in a dual party-government system like all other governing institutions in mainland China. Ningxiang's political system reflects the two major influences on the historical development of China: on the one hand, its legacy as an over 2,000 years feudal system region, and on the other, the powerful influence exerted by China's neighbor to the north, the Soviet Union.

The Mayor of Ningxiang is the highest-ranking official in the People's Government of Ningxiang or Ningxiang Municipal Government. However, in the city's dual party-government governing system, the Mayor has less power than the Communist Party of Ningxiang Municipal Committee Secretary, colloquially termed the "CPC Party Chief of Ningxiang" or "Communist Party Secretary of Ningxiang".

== Introduction ==
As a city of the Communist State, Ningxiang's system of government was based on the Soviet Union system of one party dictatorship. This is referred to as "Soviet Union-style" democracy.

Ningxiang is governed by a democratically elected People's Congress, which corresponds to the parliament of democratic country. The Head of the Ningxiang Municipal Government is the Mayor. The Mayor's agreement is required for an Act of Ningxiang People's Congress to become law. As of 2016, there were 373 Members of Ningxiang People's Congress, who were all elected.

== List of CPC Party secretaries of Ningxiang ==
=== Republic of China ===
No.	English name	Chinese name	Took office	Left office	Notes
1	Hu Hui	胡辉	February 1925	November 1927	Secretary of CPC Party branch of Ningxiang
2	Zhou Xiangpu	周湘圃	January 1926	April 1928	Secretary of CPC Special Party branch of Ningxiang
3	Wen Xingqiao	文星桥	December 1926	January 1927	Acting Secretary of CPC Special Party branch of Ningxiang
4	Yan Yueqiao	严岳乔	January 1927	June 1927	
5	Luo Yangzhen	罗养真	June 1927	September 1926	
6	Zeng San	曾三	July 1927	July 1927	No assignment
7	Xia Chibing	夏尺冰	September 1927	September 1928	
8	Dai Zhuoliang	戴卓良	December 1927	January 1928	
9	Jiang Yunkai	姜运开	September 1928	December 1928	
10	Zhong Jie	钟杰	January 1929	August 1930	Chief of CPC Ningxiang Underground Working Committee
11	Xu Zhisheng	许智生	September 1930	June 1932	
12	Li Pinzhen	李品珍	February 1938	August 1939	
13	He Yinnan	何荫南	August 1939	April 1940	
14	Zhang Zhonglian	张忠廉	September 1945	September 1946	
15	Pang Zhuzhong	庞柱中	October 1946	May 1949	
16	Zhou Zheng	周政	May 1949	August 1949	

=== People's Republic of China ===
No.	English name	Chinese name	Took office	Left office	Notes
1	Li Ruishan	李瑞山	August 1949	April 1951	
2	Li Zhe	李哲	April 1951	September 1952	
3	Liu Yanan	刘亚南	September 1952	February 1953	
4	Zhou Zheng	周政	March 1953	October 1954	
5	Fan Zhide	范志德	October 1954	April 1955	
6	Li Xueliang	李学良	April 1955	August 1955	
7	Zhang Heting	张鹤亭	August 1955	April 1956	
8	Li Xueliang	李学良	June 1956	January 1958	
9	Li Xueliang	李学良	January 1958	February 1960	
10	Li Xueliang	李学良	February 1960	May 1961	
11	Kang Zheng	康政	May 1961	May 1962	
12	Zhang Xingyu	张兴玉	May 1962	July 1964	
13	Guo Liangui	郭连贵	July 1964	February 1968	
14	Guo Zhanyuan	郭占元	October 1969	October 1970	
15	Guo Zhanyuan	郭占元	October 1970	September 1971	
16	Zhang Hui	张惠	September 1971	March 1972	
17	Zhang Hui	张惠	March 1972	August 1973	
18	Yang Shifang	杨世芳	August 1973	May 1977	
19	Wu Yanfan	吴彦凡	May 1977	December 1977	
20	Wu Yanfan	吴彦凡	December 1977	December 1978	
21	Zheng Guocai	郑国才	December 1978	August 1982	
22	Yu Qinghua	宇庆华	August 1982	September 1985	
23	Yu Qinghua	宇庆华	September 1985	October 1988	
24	Yu Qinghua	宇庆华	October 1988	November 1990	
25	Wang Bolin	王柏林	November 1992	September 1993	
26	Zhou Libing	周里冰	September 1993	October 1997	
27	Chen Lixiang	陈立湘	October 1997	December 1999	
28	Yuan Guanqing	袁观清	December 1999	October 2000	
29	Xu Xiangping	徐湘平	October 2000	October 2002	
30	Xu Xiangping	徐湘平	October 2002	March 2004	
31	Guo Zhenggui	虢正贵	March 2004	June 2006	
32	Guo Zhenggui	虢正贵	June 2006	February 2008	
33	Li Shiqiu	黎石秋	February 2008	March 2012	
34	Li Chunqiu	黎春秋	March 2012	March 2015	
35	Tan Xiaoping	谭小平	March 2015	July 2016	
36	Zhou Hui	周辉	July 2016	September 2020	
37	Yu Xinfan	于新凡	September 2020		

== List of mayors of Ningxiang ==
No.	English name	Chinese name	Took office	Left office	Notes
1	Zhang Jiyuan	张继源	August 1949	August 1952	
2	Zhou Zheng	周政	August 1952	May 1953	
3	Wang Shouzeng	王寿增	May 1953	April 1955	
4	Liu Hongye	刘鸿业	April 1955	December 1956	
5	Zhang Runqing	张润清	December 1956	May 1958	
6	Zhang Runqing	张润清	May 1958	December 1960	
7	Niu Yuxiang	牛玉祥	December 1960	September 1964	
8	Niu Yuxiang	牛玉祥	September 1964	April 1966	
9	Tao Jibin	陶季斌	April 1966	1966	
10	Wang Shaopeng	王绍鹏	February 1968	May 1969	Director of Revolutionary Committee
11	Guo Zhanyuan	郭占元	May 1969	October 1970	Director of Revolutionary Committee
12	Guo Zhanyuan	郭占元	October 1970	September 1971	Director of Revolutionary Committee
13	Zhang Hui	张惠	September 1971	July 1973	Director of Revolutionary Committee
14	Yang Shifang	杨世芳	July 1973	October 1976	Director of Revolutionary Committee
15	Wu Yanfan	吴彦凡	December 1977	December 1978	Director of Revolutionary Committee
16	Zheng Guocai	郑国才	December 1978	December 1980	Director of Revolutionary Committee
17	Yu Qinghua	宇庆华	December 1980	December 1983	
18	Tang Zhihua	唐植华	December 1983	September 1984	
19	Liu Qixin	刘启欣	September 1984	September 1985	
20	Liang Jianqiang	梁建强	September 1985	March 1987	
21	Liang Jianqiang	梁建强	March 1987	October 1988	
22	Liang Jianqiang	梁建强	October 1988	February 1990	
23	Liang Jianqiang	梁建强	February 1990	November 1992	
24	Zhou Libing	周里冰	November 1992	March 1994	
25	Chen Lixiang	陈立湘	March 1994	August 1997	
26	Zhou Yueyun	周岳云	August 1997	January 2000	
27	Xu Xiangping	徐湘平	January 2000	December 2000	
28	Guo Zhenggui	虢正贵	December 2000	October 2002	
29	Guo Zhenggui	虢正贵	November 2002	March 2004	
30	Li Shiqiu	黎石秋	March 2004	June 2006	
31	Li Shiqiu	黎石秋	June 2006	November 2007	
32	Li Shiqiu	黎石秋	November 2007	April 2008	
33	Li Chunqiu	黎春秋	April 2008	October 2012	
34	Zhou Hui	周辉	October 2012	December 2017	
35	Fu Xuming	付旭明	December 2017		

== List of chairmen of Ningxiang People's Congress ==
No.	English name	Chinese name	Took office	Left office	Notes
1	Li Ruishan	李瑞山	February 1950	November 1951	
2	Li Zhe	李哲	November 1951	December 1952	
3	Zhou Zheng	周政	December 1952	December 1953	
4	Wang Shaopeng	王绍鹏	February 1968	May 1969	Director of Revolutionary Committee
5	Guo Zhanyuan	郭占元	May 1969	October 1970	Director of Revolutionary Committee
6	Guo Zhanyuan	郭占元	October 1970	September 1971	Director of Revolutionary Committee
7	Zhang Hui	张惠	September 1971	July 1973	Director of Revolutionary Committee
8	Yang Shifang	杨世芳	July 1973	October 1976	Director of Revolutionary Committee
9	Wu Yanfan	吴彦凡	December 1977	December 1978	Director of Revolutionary Committee
10	Zheng Guocai	郑国才	December 1978	December 1980	Director of Revolutionary Committee
11	Tao Jibin	陶季斌	December 1980		
12	Huang Rangquan	黄让泉	September 1985	March 1986	
13	Peng Yong	彭勇	March 1986	March 1987	
14	Peng Yong	彭勇	March 1987	October 1988	
15	Peng Yong	彭勇	October 1988	February 1990	
16	Peng Yong	彭勇	February 1990		
17	liu Zhiliang	刘芝良	November 1992	December 1997	
18	liu Zhiliang	刘芝良	December 1997	November 2002	
19	Liu Qiucheng	刘秋成	November 2002	June 2011	
20	He Yinghui	贺应辉	June 2011	2012	
21	He Yinghui	贺应辉	2012		

== List of chairmen of CPPCC Ningxiang Committee ==
No.	English name	Chinese name	Took office	Left office	Notes
1	Li Xueliang	李学良	November 1956	March 1961	
2	Li Xueliang	李学良	March 1961		
3	Yang Dingguo	杨定国	December 1980	March 1984	
4	Yang Dingguo	杨定国	March 1984	October 1988	
5	Huang Guoxiang	黄国祥	October 1988	February 1990	
6	Huang Guoxiang	黄国祥	February 1990	November 1992	
7	Huang Guoxiang	黄国祥	November 1992	December 1997	
8	Wang Bin	王斌	December 1997	November 2002	
9	He Yinghui	贺应辉	November 2002	June 2011	
10	Yu Yajun	喻亚军	June 2011	November 2012	
11	Yu Yajun	喻亚军	November 2012	2016	
12	Deng Jieping	邓杰平	2016		
