= 1997–98 Taiwanese local elections =

- 29 November 1997; 5 December 1998

All 25 mayors/magistrates of special municipalities, cities, counties
	First party	Second party
Leader	Lin Yi-hsiung	Lee Teng-hui
Party	DPP	KMT
Leader since	18 July 1998	27 January 1988
Mayors/ Magistrates	13	9
Change	▲6	▼7

Local elections of Taiwan were held in 1997 and 1998 to elect magistrates of counties and mayors of cities on 29 November 1997, and mayors and councillors of special municipalities on 5 December 1998.

Opposition Democratic Progressive Party (DPP) won in the 1997 election, controlling majority of mayors/magistrates across the country and winning more popular votes than the ruling Kuomintang (KMT) for the first time. While the two polls were seen as confidence votes of President Lee Teng-hui, they marked the beginning of the historic peaceful transition of power which would occur in 2000.

== Counties and cities ==
Election results for counties and cities

The DPP successfully flipped seven counties and cities, Keelung City, Hsinchu City, Taichung City, Taichung County, Tainan City, Taoyuan County, and Pingtung County, but were defeated by the Kuomintang in Penghu County. In Nantou County, the Kuomintang was defeated by an independent candidate.

Turnout of the election is 65.92%, with 7,784,908 voting out of 11,809,277 registered electorates.

Magistrate of Taipei
Party	Candidate	Votes	%
DPP	Su Tseng-chang	571,658	40.67%
KMT	Hsieh Shen-shan	543,516	38.67%
Independent	Lin Chih-chia	154,590	11.00%
Independent	Liao Hsueh-kuang	70,619	5.02%
New	Yang Tai-shun	32,902	2.34%
Independent	Stella Chou	32,373	2.30%

Mayor of Keelung City
Party	Candidate	Votes	%
DPP	Lee Chin-yung	73,398	42.75%
KMT	Liu Wen-hsiung	65,176	37.97%
Independent	Hsu Tsai-li	33,099	19.28%

Magistrate of Yilan County
Party	Candidate	Votes	%
DPP	Liu Shou-cheng	122,114	53.83%
KMT	Liao Feng-teh	104,744	46.17%

Magistrate of Taoyuan County
Party	Candidate	Votes	%
DPP	Annette Lu	375,500	56.20%
KMT	Chen Ken-te	286,993	42.96%
Social Reform Party	Hsu Lien-te	5,619	0.84%

Magistrate of Hsinchu County
Party	Candidate	Votes	%
DPP	Lin Kuang-hua	70,879	36.12%
KMT	Cheng Yung-chin	64,551	32.89%
Independent	Chiu Ching-chun	59,393	30.26%
Independent	Hsu Neng-an	1,424	0.73%

Mayor of Hsinchu City
Party	Candidate	Votes	%
DPP	James Tsai	81,328	56.11%
KMT	Lin Chih-cheng	62,017	42.79%
Independent	Wang Shao-chuan	1,593	1.10%

Magistrate of Miaoli County
Party	Candidate	Votes	%
Independent	Fu Hsueh-peng	153,528	54.80%
KMT	Ho Chih-hui	99,109	35.37%
New	Huang Ta-yeh	15,871	5.66%
DPP	Hsu Chin-jung	11,678	4.17%

Magistrate of Taichung County
Party	Candidate	Votes	%
DPP	Liao Yung-lai	223,222	37.60%
KMT	Kuo Jung-cheng	173,667	29.26%
KMT	Shyu Jong-shyong	144,427	24.33%
Independent	Liu Chuan-chung	35,533	5.99%
Independent	Chen Chin-lung	10,804	1.82%
Independence	Chien Wen-nan	5,950	1.00%

Mayor of Taichung City
Party	Candidate	Votes	%
DPP	Chang Wen-ying	179,461	49.57%
KMT	Hung Chao-nan	149,438	41.28%
New	Sung Ai-ke	26,515	7.32%
Independence	Cheng Pang-chen	6,622	1.83%

Magistrate of Changhua County
Party	Candidate	Votes	%
KMT	Juan Kang-meng	290,335	49.56%
DPP	Wong Chin-chu	285,058	48.66%
Independent	Chang Jung-chang	10,443	1.78%

Magistrate of Nantou County
Party	Candidate	Votes	%
Independent	Peng Pai-hsien	78,690	31.61%
DPP	Lin Tsung-nan	76,689	30.80%
KMT	Hsu Hui-yu	74,966	30.11%
New	Chen Cheng-sheng	18,066	7.26%
Independent	Wu Ching-chiang	559	0.22%

Magistrate of Yunlin County
Party	Candidate	Votes	%
KMT	Su Wen-hsiung	125,376	34.93%
Independent	Chang Jung-wei	122,166	34.04%
DPP	Liao Ta-lin	104,499	29.11%
Independent	Ou Ming-shien	6,882	1.92%

Magistrate of Chiayi County
Party	Candidate	Votes	%
KMT	Lee Ya-ching	136,161	53.26%
DPP	Ho Chia-jong	119,499	46.74%

Mayor of Chiayi City
Party	Candidate	Votes	%
Independent	Chang Po-ya	58,544	50.23%
KMT	Chiang Yi-hsiung	49,551	42.52%
DPP	Tsai Hung-chang	6,350	5.45%
Independence	Tsang Ting-sheng	2,103	1.80%

Magistrate of Tainan County
Party	Candidate	Votes	%
DPP	Mark Chen	328,641	65.73%
KMT	Hung Yu-chin	171,357	34.27%

Mayor of Tainan City
Party	Candidate	Votes	%
DPP	George Chang	116,145	35.75%
KMT	Lin Nan-sheng	68,124	20.97%
Independent	Hsu Tain-tsair	64,228	19.77%
KMT	Chen Jung-cheng	57,854	17.81%
Independent	Lin Shou-hung	9,097	2.80%
New	Kao Chia-chun	4,737	1.46%
Independent	Fang Chin-hai	4,699	1.45%

Magistrate of Kaohsiung County
Party	Candidate	Votes	%
DPP	Yu Cheng-hsien	271,989	51.74%
KMT	Huang Hung-tu	234,960	44.69%
Independent	Cheng Te-hui	10,575	2.01%
Independent	Lin Ching-yuan	8,201	1.56%

Magistrate of Pingtung County
Party	Candidate	Votes	%
DPP	Su Jia-chyuan	227,506	55.42%
KMT	Tseng Yung-chuan	170,154	41.45%
Independent	Lee Ching-wen	12,867	3.13%

Magistrate of Taitung County
Party	Candidate	Votes	%
KMT	Chen Chien-nien	48,365	47.64%
Independent	Hsu Ching-yuan	47,340	46.63%
DPP	Huang Chao-hui	5,818	5.73%

Magistrate of Hualien County
Party	Candidate	Votes	%
KMT	Wang Ching-feng	72,456	56.76%
DPP	You Ying-lung	55,194	43.24%

Magistrate of Penghu County
Party	Candidate	Votes	%
KMT	Lai Feng-wei	20,946	57.53%
DPP	Hsu Pi-long	15,194	42.47%

== Special municipalities ==
Election results for special municipalities

Elections for mayors and councillors of special municipalities Taipei and Kaohsiung were held on 5 December 1998. The nail-biting election resulted in both incumbents defeated with a narrow margin, including an unexpected victory for the DPP in Kaohsiung.

=== Taipei ===
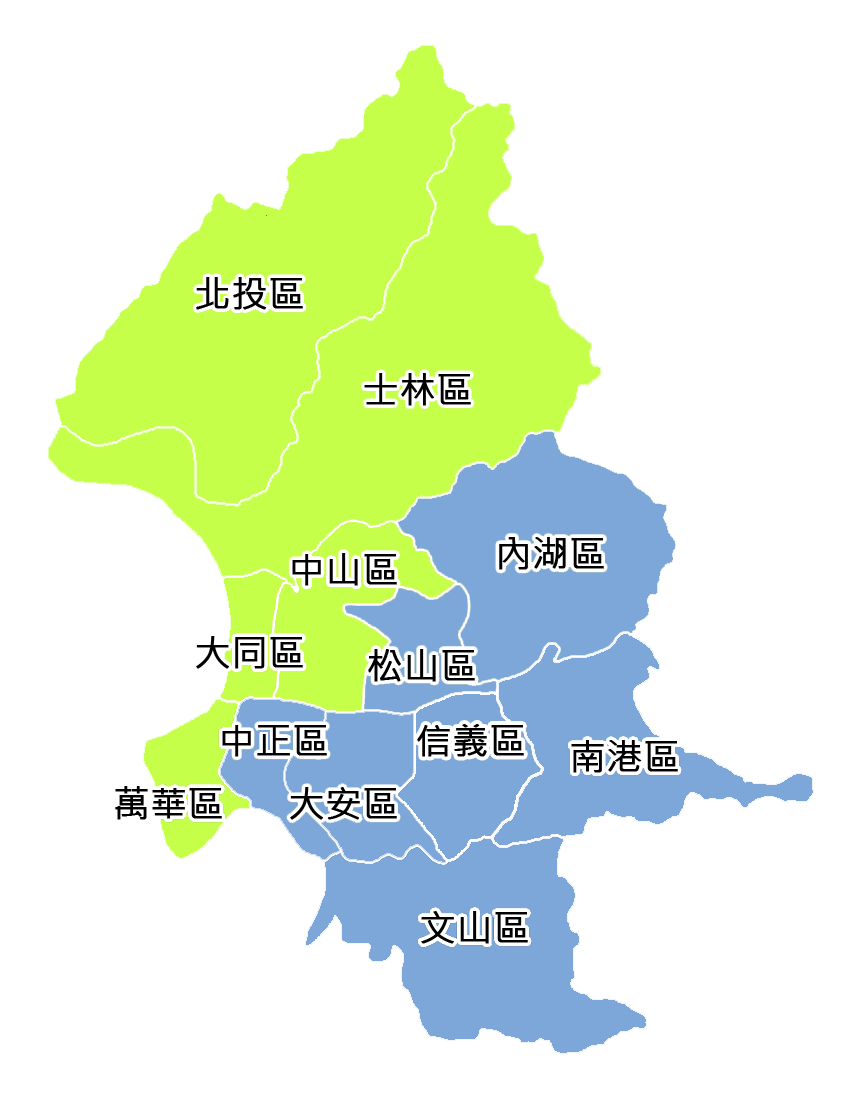
Taipei mayoral election result by districts Districts led by Ma Ying-jeou Districts led by Chen Shui-bian

Chen Shui-bian of the DPP seek a second four-year term with a high popularity of 80%, while the KMT nominated Ma Ying-jeou, ex-Minister of Justice who earlier declined to run in the mayoral election. Ma eventually beat Chen by around 0.6% of votes. Analysts believed tactical voting by supporters of New Party contributed to the KMT's win, in addition to the discontent with Chen's aggressive policies.

1998 Taipei mayoral election
Candidate	Party	Votes	%
Ma Ying-jeou	Kuomintang	766,377	51.13
Chen Shui-bian	Democratic Progressive Party	688,072	45.91
Wang Chien-shien	New Party	44,452	2.97
Total		1,498,901	100.00
Valid votes		1,498,901	99.16
Invalid/blank votes		12,734	0.84
Total votes		1,511,635	100.00
Registered voters/turnout		1,868,860	80.89

1998 Taipei City Council election
Party	Votes	%	Seats	+/–
Kuomintang	589,907	40.08	23	+3
Democratic Progressive Party	455,613	30.96	19	+4
New Party	273,195	18.56	9	-2
New Nation Alliance	27,282	1.85	0	–
Green Party Taiwan	22,274	1.51	0	–
Taiwan Independence Party	9,633	0.65	0	–
Chinese Woman's Party	923	0.06	0	–
Independents	92,966	6.32	1	-5
Total	1,471,793	100.00	52	–
Valid votes	1,471,793	97.61		
Invalid/blank votes	36,051	2.39		
Total votes	1,507,844	100.00		
Registered voters/turnout	1,864,314	80.88		

=== Kaohsiung ===
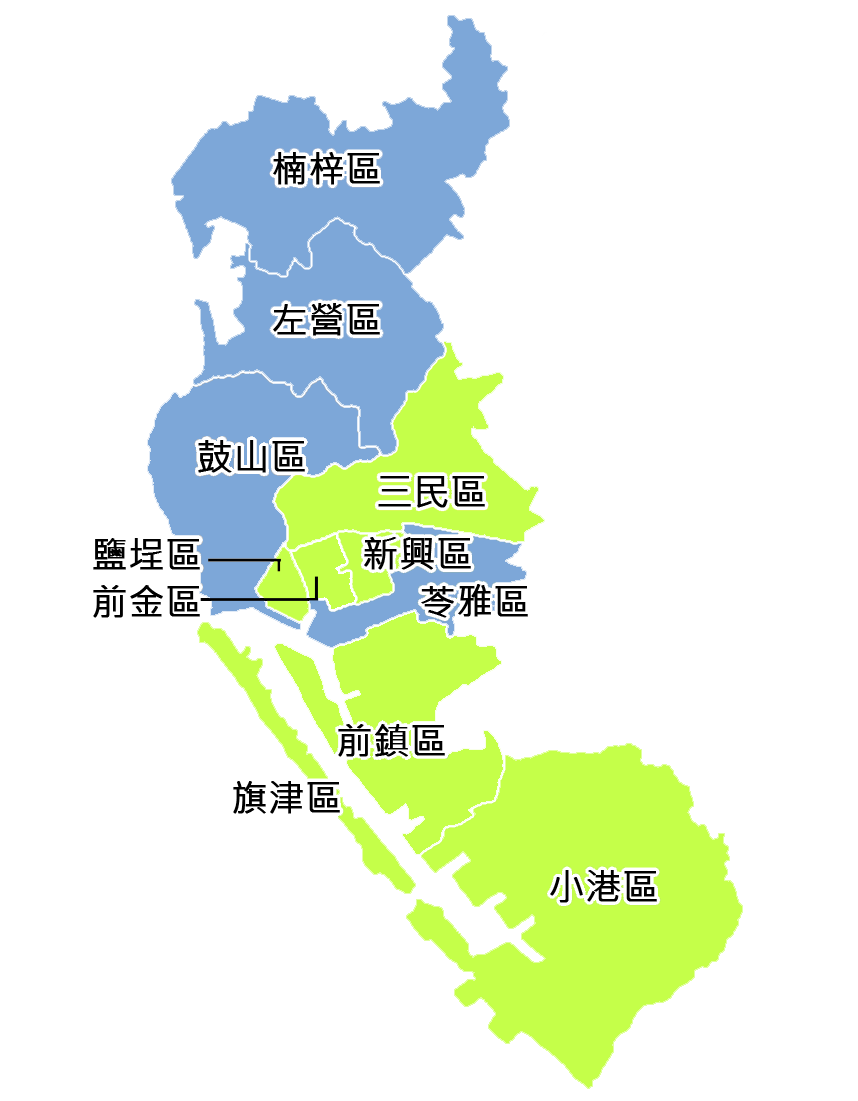
Kaohsiung mayoral election result by districts Districts led by Wu Den-yih Districts led by Frank Hsieh

Following the defeat in vice-presidential election, Frank Hsieh of the DPP started considering running in Kaohsiung mayoral election. In 1997, Chen Che-nan, Hsieh's party colleague decided not to run against Hsieh in the party primary for the Kaohsiung poll, reportedly after an intervention by Taipei Mayor Chen who later promoted him as secretary-general of Taipei Government.

On the other hand, incumbent Wu Den-yih from the KMT faced small-scale rebellion from local party branch after former Kaohsiung mayor Wang Yu-yun criticised Wu for being ungrateful. In the run-up of the election, an ex-secretary of Wu published a recording tape, claiming Wu had an affairs with a reporter. Despite found to be fake after the election, the incident nevertheless damaged Wu's popularity.

During the campaign, Wu attacked Hsieh as being "inhumane" after he agreed to act as a defence attorney for the murderer of Pai Hsiao-yen, hoping to persuade his surrender. The personal attack was said to have further pushed for Hsieh's victory. The Hsieh–Wu contest was described as “a mud-slinging match between two unsightly, naked men.”

1998 Kaohsiung mayoral election
Candidate	Party	Votes	%
Frank Hsieh	Democratic Progressive Party	387,797	48.71
Wu Den-yih	Kuomintang	383,232	48.13
Cheng Te-yao	Independent	18,699	2.35
Wu Chien-kuo	New Party	6,457	0.81
Total		796,185	100.00
Valid votes		796,185	98.54
Invalid/blank votes		11,811	1.46
Total votes		807,996	100.00
Registered voters/turnout		1,004,872	80.41

1998 Kaohsiung City Council election
Party	Votes	%	Seats	+/–
Kuomintang	357,163	45.18	25	+2
Democratic Progressive Party	211,954	26.81	9	-2
New Party	30,363	3.84	1	-1
Taiwan Independence Party	14,707	1.86	0	–
Independents	176,308	22.30	9	+1
Total	790,495	100.00	44	–
Valid votes	790,495	98.02		
Invalid/blank votes	15,996	1.98		
Total votes	806,491	100.00		
Registered voters/turnout	1,002,480	80.45		
