= Legislative Yuan constituencies in Hsinchu County =

Constituencies in Taiwan

Hsinchu County
- 2 Single-member constituency for the Legislative Yuan
- District(s): Hsinchu County
- Electorate: 396,492

Current constituency
- Created: 2019
- Number of members: 2

Hsinchu County electoral constituencies (Chinese: 新竹縣選舉區) consist of 2 single-member constituencies, each represented by a member of the Republic of China Legislative Yuan. From the 2020 legislative election onwards, the number of Hsinchu County's seats was increased to 2 due to the county's increase in population, as it exceeded the 315,019 average for each constituency.

== Current constituencies ==
- Hsinchu County Constituency 1 - Xinfeng, Hukou, Xinpu, Qionglin, Guanxi, Jianshi Townships, Zhubei City (12 villages)
- Hsinchu County Constituency 2 - Zhudong, Hengshan, Baoshan, Beipu, Emei, Wufeng Townships, Zhubei City (19 villages)

== Historical constituencies ==
=== 2008-2016 ===
- Hsinchu County Constituency

== Legislators ==
Kuomintang Democratic Progressive Party Minkuotang

Election	Hsinchu County	
2008 7th	Chiu Ching-chun (2008-2009)^{1}	
2008 7th	Perng Shaw-jiin (2009-2012)	
2012 8th	Hsu Hsin-ying	
2016 9th	Lin Wei-chou	
Election	Hsinchu County I	Hsinchu County II
2020 10th	Lin Wei-chou	Lin Szu-ming
2024 11th	Hsu Hsin-ying	Lin Szu-ming

Chiu Ching-chun resigned in 2009 after his election as Hsinchu County magistrate.
