= Yeh Fang-hsiung =

Taiwanese politician

Yeh Fang-hsiung (Chinese: 葉芳雄; born 1945) is a Taiwanese politician.

Yeh graduated from National Hsinchu Senior Industrial Vocational School and attended Ming Hsin Engineering College.

Yeh was elected mayor of Zhubei twice, in 1998 and 2002. He was elected to the Legislative Yuan in 2004, representing the Hsinchu County Constituency. Yeh considered running for a second legislative term during the 2008 election cycle, eventually yielding to fellow Kuomintang member Chiu Ching-chun.
