= Fan Chen-tsung =

Taiwanese politician

Fan Chen-tsung MLY
- 范振宗
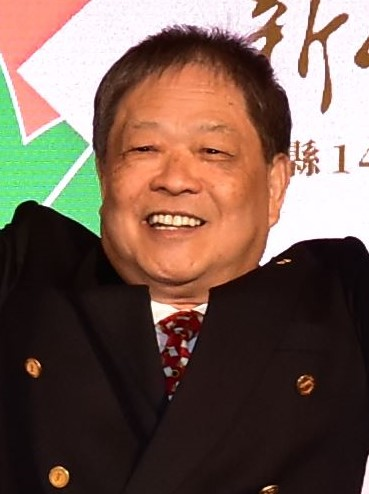

Minister of the Council of Agriculture
- In office 1 February 2002 – 2 December 2002
- Preceded by: Chen Hsi-huang
- Succeeded by: Lee Chin-lung

Speaker of Taiwan Provincial Consultative Council
- In office 21 December 2001 – 13 January 2002
- Preceded by: Peng Tien-fu
- Succeeded by: Yu Lin-ya

Member of the Legislative Yuan
- In office 26 January 1998 – 31 January 1999
- Preceded by: Lin Kuang-hua
- Constituency: Hsinchu County

Hsinchu County Magistrate
- In office 20 December 1989 – 20 December 1997
- Preceded by: Chen Chin-hsing
- Succeeded by: Lin Kuang-hua

Member of the National Assembly
- In office 1987–1990

Member of the Hsinchu County Council
- In office 1978–1986

Personal details
- Born: 20 November 1942 (age 83) Koguchi, Shinchiku, Shinchiku Prefecture, Taiwan, Empire of Japan (today Hukou, Hsinchu, Taiwan)
- Party: Democratic Progressive Party (1989–2009)
- Education: National Taiwan Ocean University (BA)

Fan Chen-tsung (Chinese: 范振宗; pinyin: Fàn Zhènzōng; Wade–Giles: Fan^{4} Chên^{4}-tsung^{1}; born 20 November 1942) is a Taiwanese politician.

== Education ==
Fan graduated from National Taiwan Ocean University.

== Career ==
From 1978 to 1986, he was a member of the Hsinchu County Council. In his second term as county councillor, Fan became the body's deputy speaker. In 1986, Fan was elected to the National Assembly and served until 1990. He ran for the magistracy of Hsinchu County as an independent in 1989, and joined the Democratic Progressive Party shortly after winning the office. In 1993, Fan won a second term. He was succeeded as magistrate by Lin Kuang-hua. Fan was subsequently appointed to Lin's vacant seat on the Legislative Yuan, taking office on 26 January 1998. Fan was elected speaker of the Taiwan Provincial Consultative Council, and left that position to assume leadership of the Council of Agriculture in 2002. He resigned on 24 November, as farmers and fishermen's collectives protested attempts to reform credit unions related to those industries. Premier Yu Shyi-kun accepted Fan's resignation two days later, and Fan officially left office on 2 December.

In July 2009, Fan and Hsu Jung-shu were invited to the Cross-Strait Economic, Trade and Culture Forum. Though the Democratic Progressive Party advised both not to go, both made the trip, resulting in the suspension of Fan and Hsu's party membership. Before he could be formally expelled, Fan withdrew from the DPP. In 2010, Fan again visited China with a group of Pan-Blue politicians. Later that year, Fan resigned his post as adviser to President Ma Ying-jeou after the Hsinchu District Court convicted Fan on corruption charges dating back to Fan's tenure as Hsinchu County Magistrate.
