= Lee Chin-lung =

Taiwanese horticulturalist and minister

- 李金龍

Minister of the Council of Agriculture of the Republic of China
- In office 3 December 2002 – 24 January 2006
- Deputy: Tai Chen-yao; Lin Kuo-hua
- Preceded by: Fan Chen-tsung
- Succeeded by: Su Jia-chyuan

Personal details
- Born: 1947 (age 78–79) Dongshan, Yilan County, Taiwan
- Education: National Chung Hsing University (BS); Leibniz University Hannover (PhD)
- Profession: Horticulturalist

Lee Chin-lung (Chinese: 李金龍; born 1947) is a Taiwanese horticulturalist who served as Minister of Agriculture from 2002 to 2006.

== Early life and education ==
Born in Dongshan, Yilan, Lee graduated from National Chung Hsing University with a bachelor's degree in horticulture in 1970 and earned his Ph.D. in horticulture from Leibniz University Hannover in Germany.

== Career ==
Lee began work as a technician at the Council of Agriculture in 1979. The next year, he joined the faculty at National Chung Hsing University, and started teaching at National Taiwan University in 1985. Lee remained active at the Council of Agriculture, leading the department of farmers' services. In this position, he was responsible for introducing agritourism to the country. By 1992, Lee had been promoted to secretary-general of the Council of Agriculture. Five years later, a severe bout of foot-and-mouth disease hit hog farms across the country, and Lin was tabbed to head the newly established Animal and Plant Quarantine Bureau, a division of the Council of Agriculture. In 2000, Lee's department again worked to fight FMD, which had surfaced in a Changhua County dairy farm. In November 2002, Lin declared a ban on shipments of apples originating from Washington state in the United States, as the Animal and Plant Quarantine Bureau had detected the presence of codling moths in shipments delivered to the Port of Kaohsiung. A month after declaring the ban, Lee succeeded Fan Chen-tsung as agricultural minister. Soon after taking office, Lee established a task force dedicated to ecological conservation in response to a flock of black-faced spoonbills contracting botulism while at the Chiku bird sanctuary. In March 2003, seventeen passengers on the Alishan Forest Railway were killed after a train spun out of control. Because the Council of Agriculture was responsible for the management of the railway, Lin offered an apology and NT$3 million in compensation to the families of the victims. He also attempted to resign his position, but the offer was not accepted. Later that year, Lee represented Taiwan at the World Trade Organization Ministerial Conference. In 2004, Lee merged the COA's Central Taiwan Office and Food and Agriculture Department into one department, the Food and Agriculture Administration, after receiving approval from the Legislative Yuan to make the move. Tropical Storm Mindulle hit Taiwan in July and caused $5.75 billion in damage, after which Lee pledged to enforce regulations on farming in mountainous areas. In October, Japan accepted the first shipment of Taiwanese rice since 1971, an action Lee accredited to the government's response in acceding to the World Trade Organization in 2002. In November, Lee established the National Red Fire Ant Control Center to aid the eradication of red imported fire ants from Taiwan. Lin was featured in the documentary Let it Be, released that year. In 2005, the Council of Agriculture began a campaign to help people avoid consumption of pork products produced from sick animals. Duck eggs from central Taiwan were found to be contaminated by dioxins later that year, and the COA worked with the Environmental Protection Administration to test the air, soil, and quality of feed used by farmers. Su Jia-chyuan replaced Lee as Minister of Agriculture in January 2006. Since leaving office, Lee has criticized the COA for its slow reaction to a 2008 H5N2 outbreak, as well as accused the Forestry Bureau of arranging work for businesses through questionable build-operate-transfer deals.
