= Hsinchu County Constituency 2 =

Constituency of the Legislative Yuan of Taiwan

- Single-member constituency for the Legislative Yuan
- District(s): Zhudong, Hengshan, Baoshan, Beipu, Emei, Wufeng, Zhubei City (19 villages)
- Electorate: 232,865 (2024 election)

Current constituency
- Created: 2020
- Party: Kuomintang
- Member: Lin Szu-ming
- Created from: Hsinchu County Constituency (part)

Hsinchu County Constituency 2 (Chinese: 新竹縣第二選舉區) is one of the 73 regional constituencies represented in the Legislative Yuan, the national legislature of Taiwan. It was created in 2020 following boundary changes across Taiwan, and elects one legislator, through first-past-the-post voting, to the Legislative Yuan. It has been represented by Lin Szu-ming of the Kuomintang since 2020.

== Legislators ==
Election	Legislator	Party
2020	Lin Szu-ming	Kuomintang

== Election results ==

=== 2020 ===
2020 Taiwanese legislative election: Hsinchu County 2
Candidate	Party	Votes	%
Lin Szu-ming	Kuomintang	58,575	36.17
Cheng Chao-fang	Democratic Progressive Party	56,075	34.62
Chiu Ching-ya	Congress Party Alliance	22,964	14.18
Lin Shuo-yen	Taiwan People's Party	17,902	11.05
Chen Kuan-yu	Green Party Taiwan	4,121	2.54
Liu Shih-jui	Taiwan Statebuilding Party	1,245	0.77
Huang Hsiu-lung	Independent	1,072	0.66
Total		161,954	100.00
Valid votes		161,954	98.34
Invalid/blank votes		2,730	1.66
Total votes		164,684	100.00
Registered voters/turnout		215,236	76.51
Majority		2,500	1.55
Kuomintang win (new seat)			

=== 2024 ===
* denotes the incumbent legislator

2024 Taiwanese legislative election: Hsinchu County 2
Candidate	Party	Votes	%	+/–
Lin Szu-ming*	Kuomintang	76,608	44.82	▲8.65
Wang Wan-yu	New Power Party	63,566	37.19	NEW
Tseng Sheng-kai	Democratic Progressive Party	30,738	17.98	▼16.64
Total		170,912	100.00	–
Valid votes		170,912	97.80	
Invalid/blank votes		3,846	2.20	
Total votes		174,758	100.00	
Registered voters/turnout		232,865	75.05	
Majority		13,042	7.63	
Kuomintang hold				
