= Central News Agency (Taiwan) =

National news agency of Taiwan

- 中央通訊社

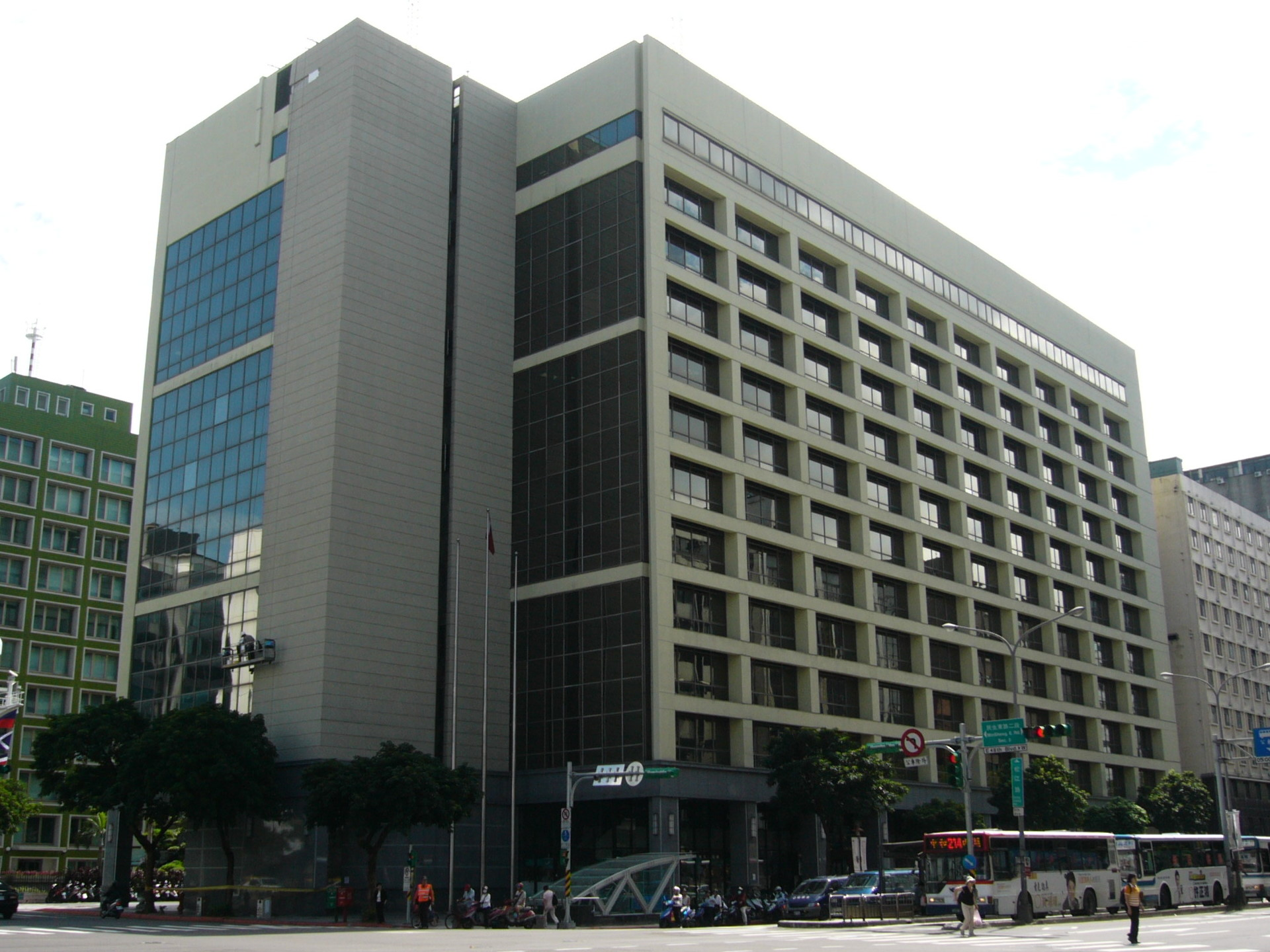
- Headquarters in Taipei
- Abbreviation: CNA
- Established: April 1, 1924; 102 years ago
- Founder: Kuomintang
- Founded at: Guangzhou, Guangdong
- Type: National news agency
- Legal status: Non-profit organisation
- Location: Taipei, Taiwan
- Region served: Worldwide, 30 locations
- Products: News
- Services: Journalism
- Official languages: Standard Chinese, English, Japanese, Indonesian, Spanish (closed 2021)
- Owner: Government of the Republic of China
- Parent organization: Executive Yuan
- Employees: 300
- Website: cna.com.tw focustaiwan.tw

Central News Agency
- Traditional Chinese: 中央通訊社
- Simplified Chinese: 中央通讯社
Transcriptions
Standard Mandarin
- Hanyu Pinyin: Zhōngyāng Tōngxùnshè

The Central News Agency (Chinese: 中央通訊社; CNA) is the national news agency of the Republic of China (Taiwan). Founded by the Kuomintang in Guangzhou in 1924, it is Taiwan's oldest and largest news agency. At the end of Chinese Civil War, CNA relocated from mainland China to Taiwan. CNA operated as a private company from 1973 until 1996, when it became a government-funded corporation and Taiwan's national news agency.

== Content ==
CNA publishes content in Chinese, and in English and Japanese under its Focus Taiwan brand. The Focus Taiwan website mostly reports government statements, weather updates, and major criminal cases, and occasionally reports features related to issues of national interest.

In July 2024, an Indonesian-language version of CNA's website was launched, with articles translated from Chinese and English using artificial intelligence and a team of Indonesian-speaking editors. A Spanish language edition, Enfoque en Taiwán, was closed 31 March 2021. In September 2026, CNA announced the return of Enfoque en Taiwán, with artificial intelligence used in proofreading and producing stories.

== History ==
=== Founding ===
On March 28, 1924, the Kuomintang Central Executive Committee decided to establish a news agency under the party's propaganda department and required local party branches and members to provide news materials. On April 1, CNA was founded in Guangzhou and began to distribute news wires as the Kuomintang Central Executive Committee Propaganda Department Agency. When the Kuomintang government established its seat in Guangzhou on July 1, 1925, the agency became responsible for editing and distributing official documents and information from the party central committee; the number of daily dispatches increased from one per day to two to three a day.

In 1927, the head of the Kuomintang propaganda department's publishing division, Yin Shuxian, became the director of the agency. The agency assumed responsibility for inspection and propaganda, which has been described as effectively serving as the party's news monitoring and censorship arm.

When Chiang Kai-shek decided to expand the Kuomintang's news operation, he tasked Hsiao Tung-tzu, one of four "senior secretaries" of the party's propaganda department who had no experience in journalism, to reorganize the news agency. Hsiao proposed three changes: separate the agency from the Central Executive Committee and rename it to "Central News Agency", establish a professional radio news station, and allow the agency to gather news independently within the limits of the law and party regulations.

Chiang agreed to the recommendations and appointed Hsiao as the director of the newly-formed CNA in 1932. The agency moved out of the Kuomintang headquarters in Dingjiaqiao, Nanjing to three longtang buildings on Shoukang Lane in Xinjiekou.

In 1936, CNA established its first bureau outside China in Tokyo with journalist Chen Bosheng as Sino-Japanese relations continued to deteriorate before the Second Sino-Japanese War. By 1937, CNA had 10 bureaus, 21 correspondents, and 159 Chinese-language newspapers that subscribed to its wire service. During the Second Sino-Japanese War, commercial newspapers relied heavily on CNA wires, including Chinese Communist Party-owned Xinhua Daily, which nearly 89% of its content originated from CNA. The agency's scale and financial support from the Kuomintang during a wartime economic downturn also caused privately owned competitors, including Kuowen News Agency, to close.

=== In Taiwan ===
After the Kuomintang took control of Taiwan following Japan's surrender in 1945, CNA Taiwan Correspondent Yeh Ming-hsun flew to Taipei to take over the bureaus and news operation of Dōmei Tsushin, the state news agency of the Empire of Japan. The agency's headquarters were relocated to Taipei in 1949 during the retreat of the government of the Republic of China to Taiwan at the end of the Chinese Civil War. On October 2, 1950, longtime Kuomintang propaganda official Tseng Hsu-pai became the first CNA director in Taiwan.

Despite the corporatization of the agency in 1973, it continued to receive heavy government subsidies, and remained Taiwan's official agency. At the time, CNA journalists received preferential treatment on various occasions, mostly government-related press conferences. After Chiang Ching-kuo became president, he brought media leaders closer to the Kuomintang by appointing them to the party's central standing committee. Tsao Sheng-fen, the president of CNA, Central Daily News and China Daily News, was joined the committee in 1981.

During democratic reforms of the 1990s, opposition parties the Democratic Progressive Party and the New Party criticized CNA's relationship with the Kuomintang and that 80% of its funding came from the state. Some in the Kuomintang also criticized CNA for being the only party-run cultural enterprise that was unable to sustain a profit. A bill attempting to reform the CNA as a national news agency in 1993 also failed due to a boycott by legislators Tai Chen-yao and Su Huo-teng.

Under Tang Pan-pan, who was appointed CNA director in December 1992, the agency introduced a series of reforms that aimed to make it more competitive and relevant. Tang appointed veteran journalists from Broadcasting Corporation of China, another Kuomintang-run media company where Tang had been employed, to lead the CNA newsroom. He also recruited 65 journalists, or 16% of CNA staff, whom Tang described as "forces of reform". CNA launched products beyond text-based news wires, including audiovisual and television news, and encouraged publishing wires throughout the day instead of concentrating on a late-afternoon window. In November 1993, it set a daily record for the most number of wires published at 531. Tang, however, was criticized for overspending and being naïve attempting to improve news professionalism when CNA remained at the control of the Kuomintang Cultural Work Committee. He was transferred to Central Daily News, the official newspaper of the Kuomintang, a little over a year in the post and was replaced by Comet Shih, the committee's deputy chairman.

=== Non-profit corporation ===
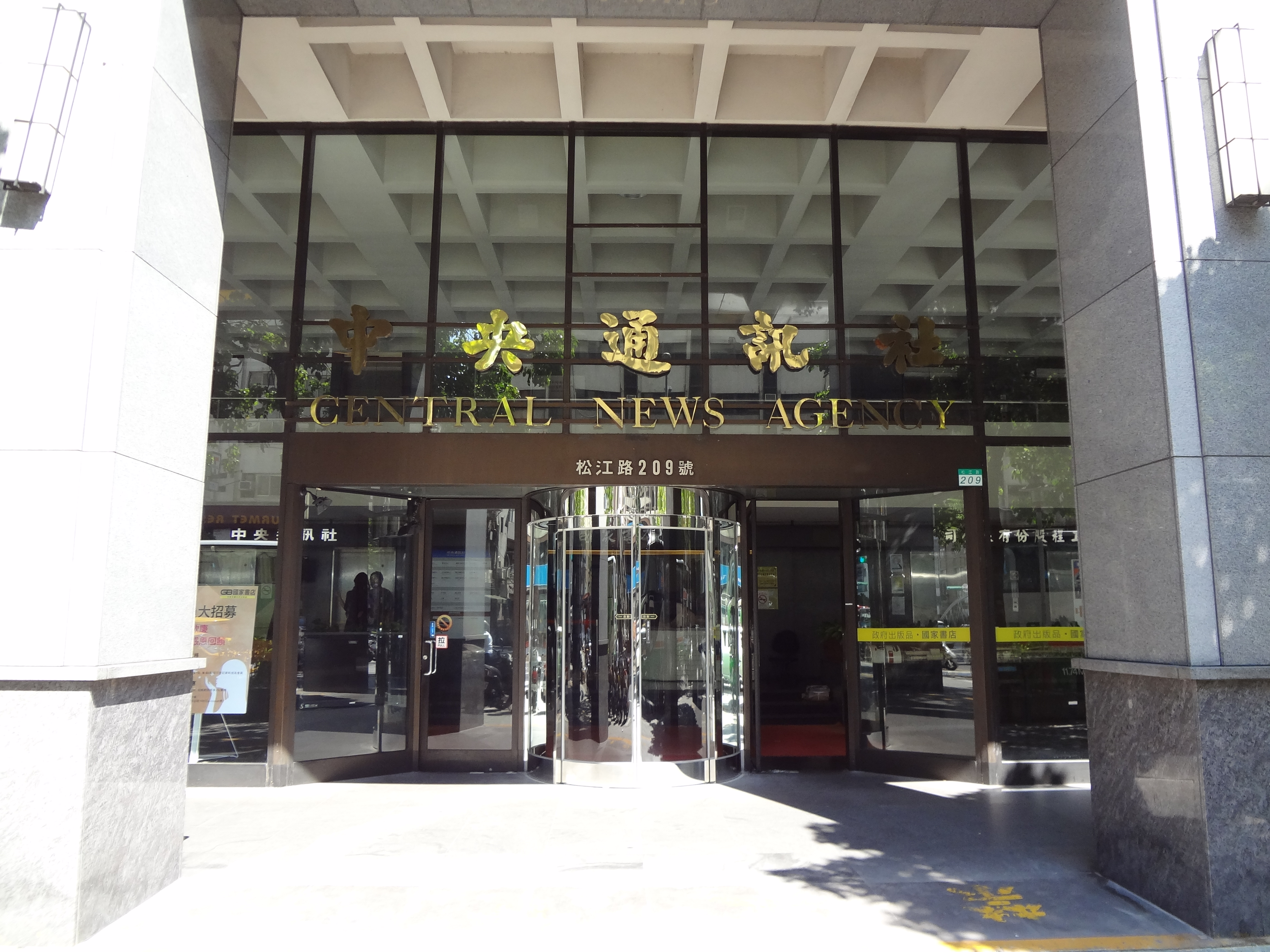
An entrance to the CNA headquarters on Songjiang Road, Taipei

On 1 July 1996, the agency became a state-run non-profit organization under a bill passed by the Legislative Yuan. Although CNA was no longer operated by the Kuomintang, it was still subject to political influence by the ruling party. During the Democratic Progressive Party (DPP) administration of President Chen Shui-bian, the government appointed people of Taiwanese origin to leadership positions of CNA, which prompted editorial changes that de-emphasized the Chinese identity in Taiwan, including the use of the term "Taiwan-U.S. relations" instead of "Chinese-U.S. relations" used previously. Under Chen's successor, the Kuomintang's Ma Ying-jeou, CNA reverted to the use of "China" to refer to Taiwan.

From 2005 to 2010, CNA's web traffic in Taiwan lagged behind other local, and even mainland Chinese, outlets.

As of 2022, it is still Taiwan's official news agency, and received part of its funding from the Executive Yuan.

News anchor Hu Wan-ling was appointed the president of CNA on October 30, 2023.

== See also ==
- Mass media in Taiwan
