= Dongshan, Yilan =

Rural township in Yilan County, Taiwan

Coordinates: 24°37′55″N 121°45′14″E

Dongshan Township 冬山鄉 Fuyuyama
- Rural township
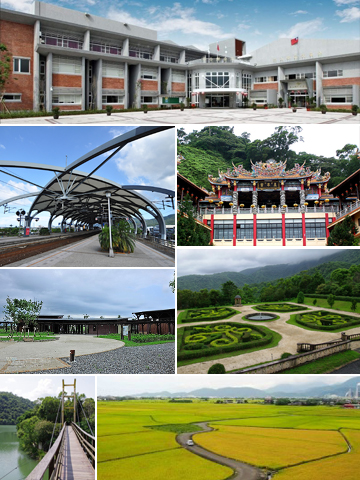

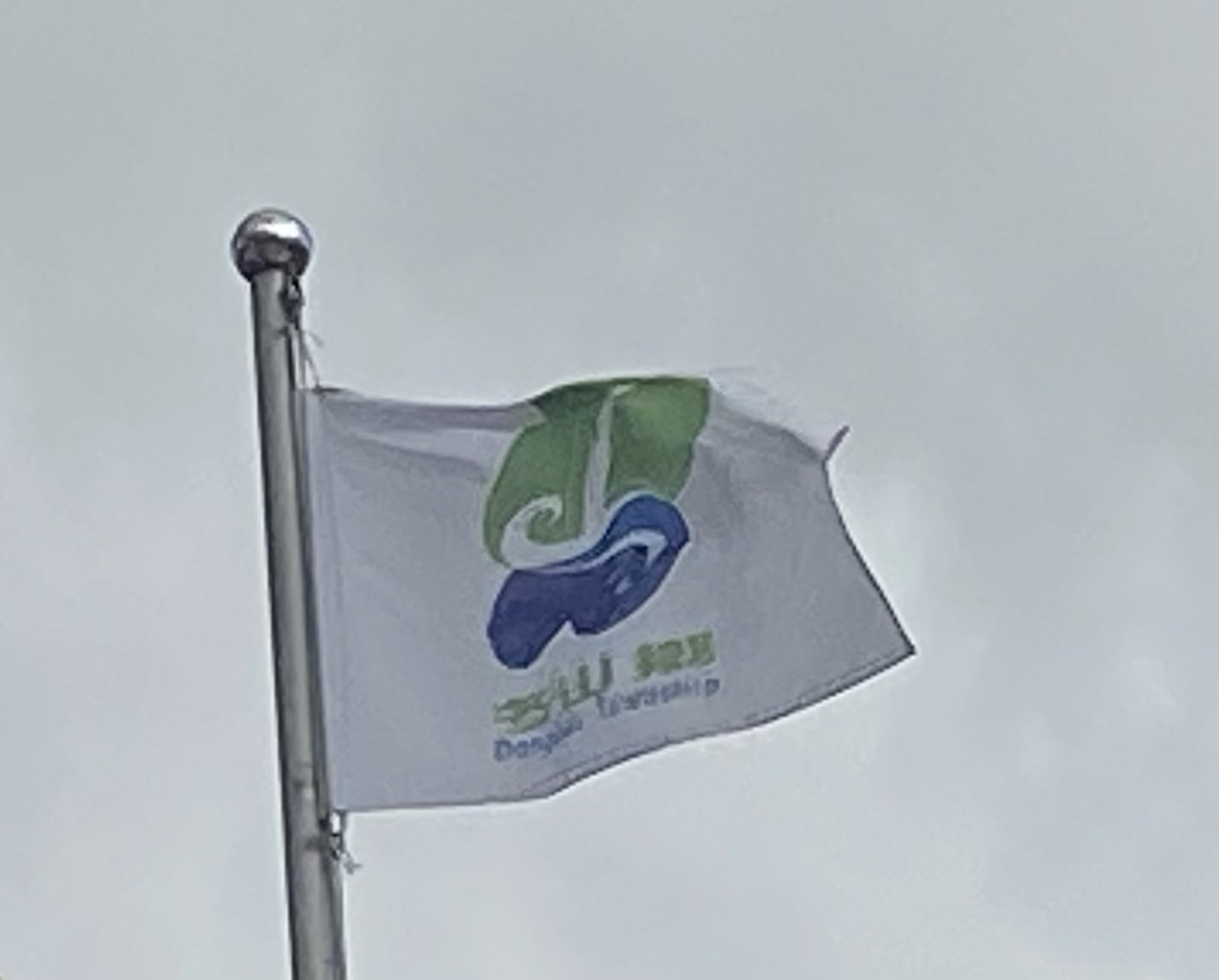
- Flag

- Dongshan Township in Yilan County
- Location: Yilan County, Taiwan

Area
  - Total: 79.86 km^{2} (30.83 sq mi)

Population (September 2023)
  - Total: 53,235
  - Density: 666.6/km^{2} (1,726/sq mi)
- Website: www.dongshan.gov.tw (in Chinese)

Dongshan Township (Chinese: 冬山鄉; pinyin: Dōngshān Xiāng; Wade–Giles: Tung^{1}-shan^{1} Hsiang^{1}; Pe̍h-ōe-jī: Tang-soaⁿ-hiong) is a rural township in the central part of Yilan County, Taiwan.

== Geography ==
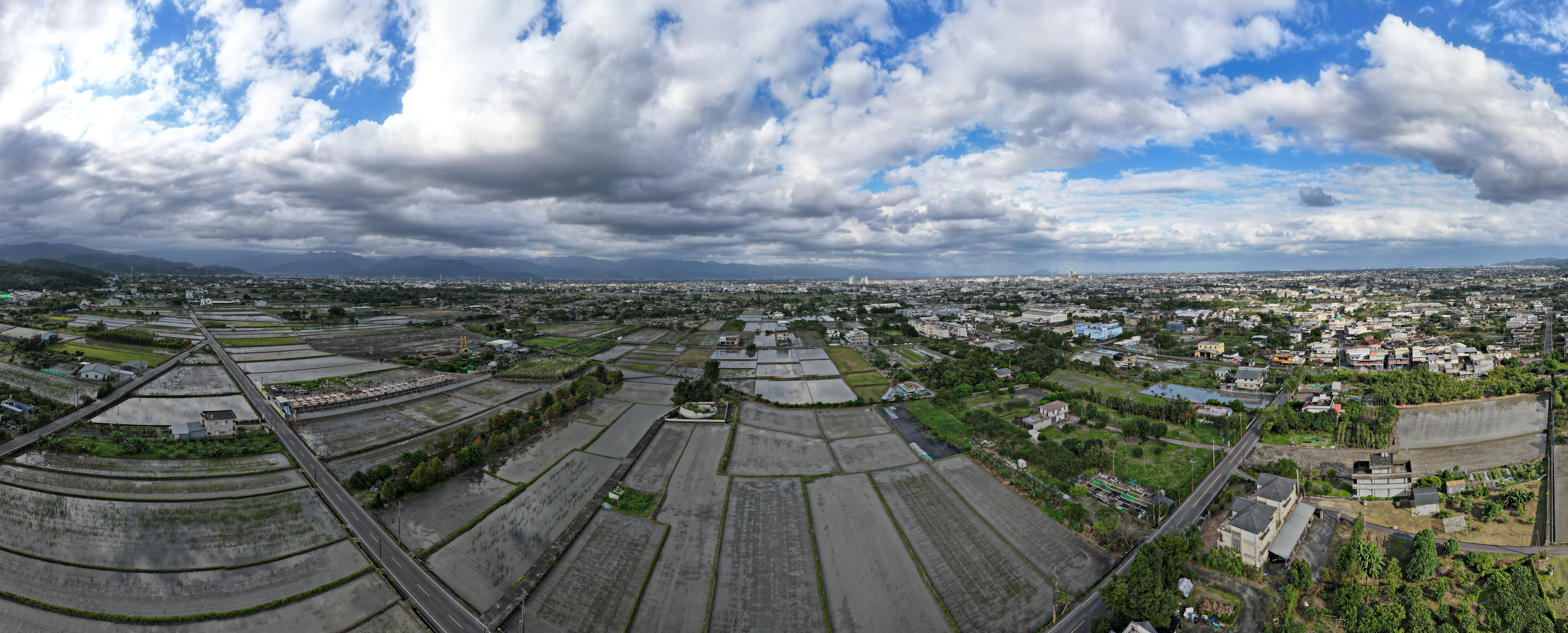
Dongshan township, Yilan from above. Shot December 2022.

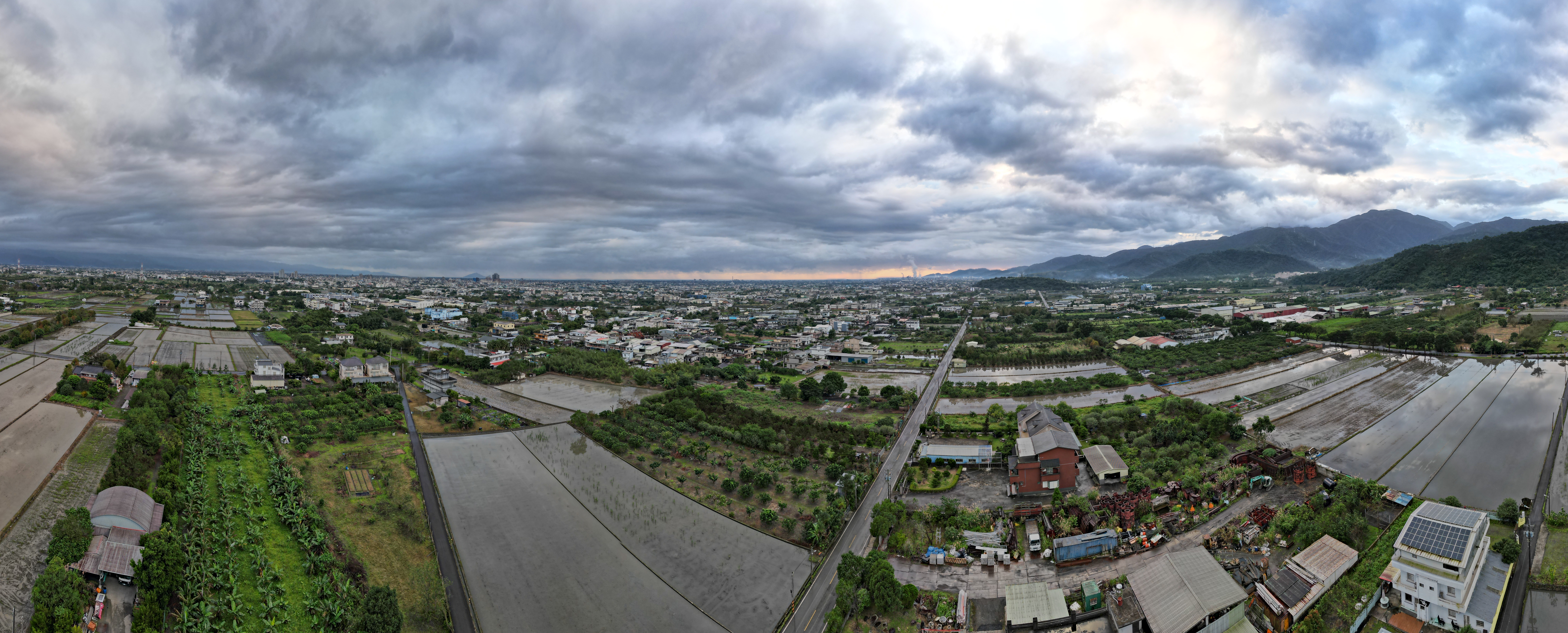
Dongshan sunrise aerial panorama. Shot December 2022.

- Area: 79.86 km^{2}
- Population: 53,235 people (September 2023)

== Administrative divisions ==
Zhenzhu, Bucheng, Sanji, Daxing, Tungcheng, Xianghe, Nanxing, Anping, Dongshan, Taihe, Babao, Wanshan, Zhongshan, Shunan, Yongmei, Wuyuan, Qunying, Qinggou, Lupu, Dean, Guangxing, Guangan, Kelin and Dajin Village.

== Economy ==
The main industries in Dongshan Township are agriculture and tourism. Local agricultural specialties include tea and pomelo. The tourism industry is centered around leisure, food and beverage, and agricultural tourism.

== Tourist attractions ==
- Meihua Lake
- Shangri-La Leisure Farm

== Transportation ==
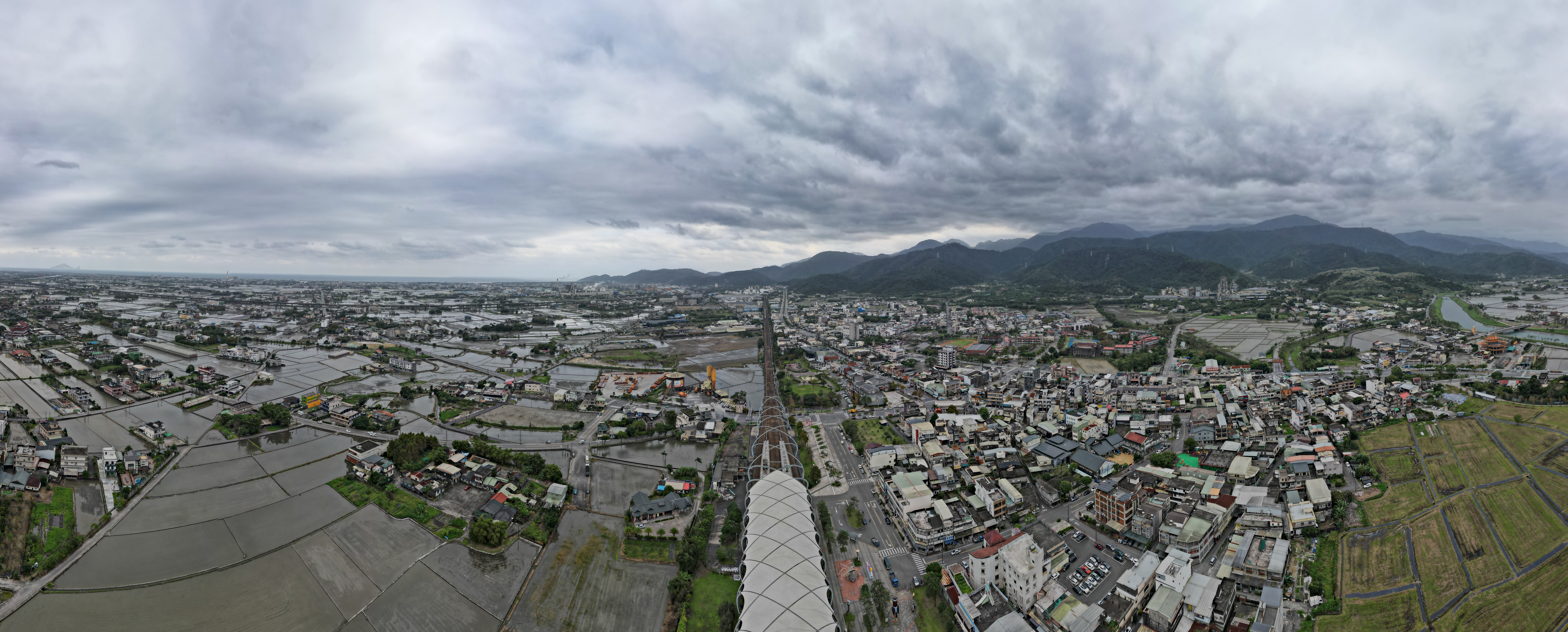
Dongshan Train station from above.

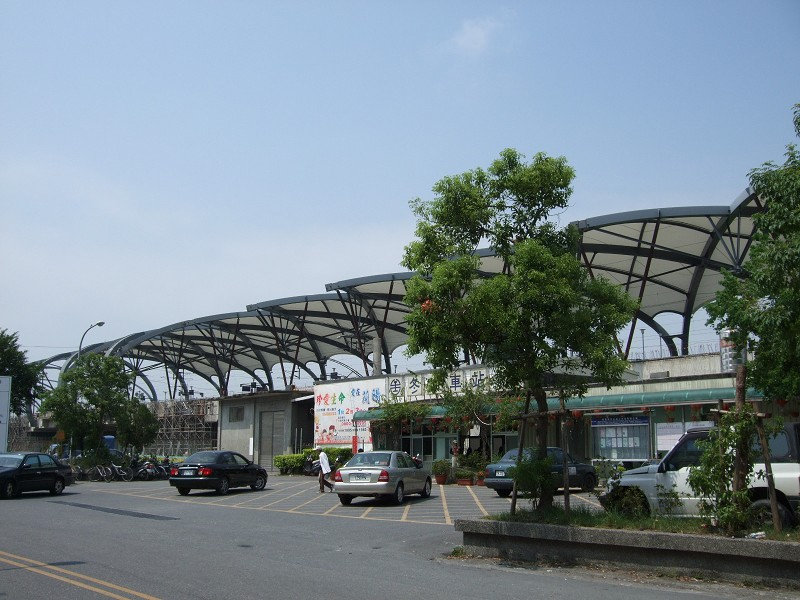
Dongshan Station

The township is accessible by the Dongshan Station of Taiwan Railway.

== Notable natives ==
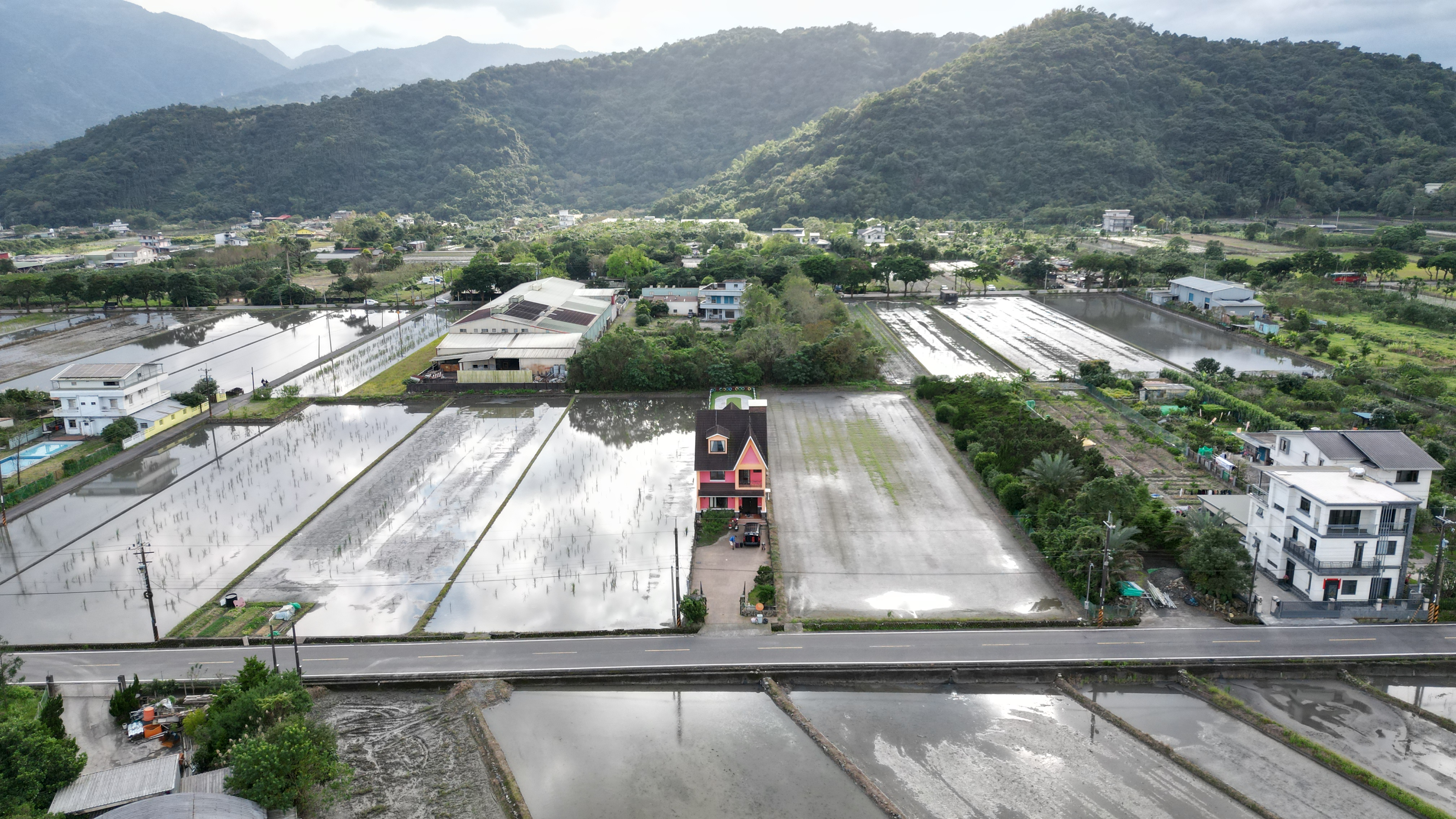
The 'Orange Castle' in Dongshan township in Yilan. Shot December 2022.

- Lee Chin-lung, Minister of Council of Agriculture (2002–2006)
- Liao Feng-teh, politician
- Yu Shyi-kun, Premier of the Republic of China (2002–2005)
- Zhuang Jin-Cai, traditional theatre musician (1935–2021)
