= Beipu Citian Temple =

Chinese temple in Beipu, Hsinchu County, Taiwan

- 北埔慈天宮
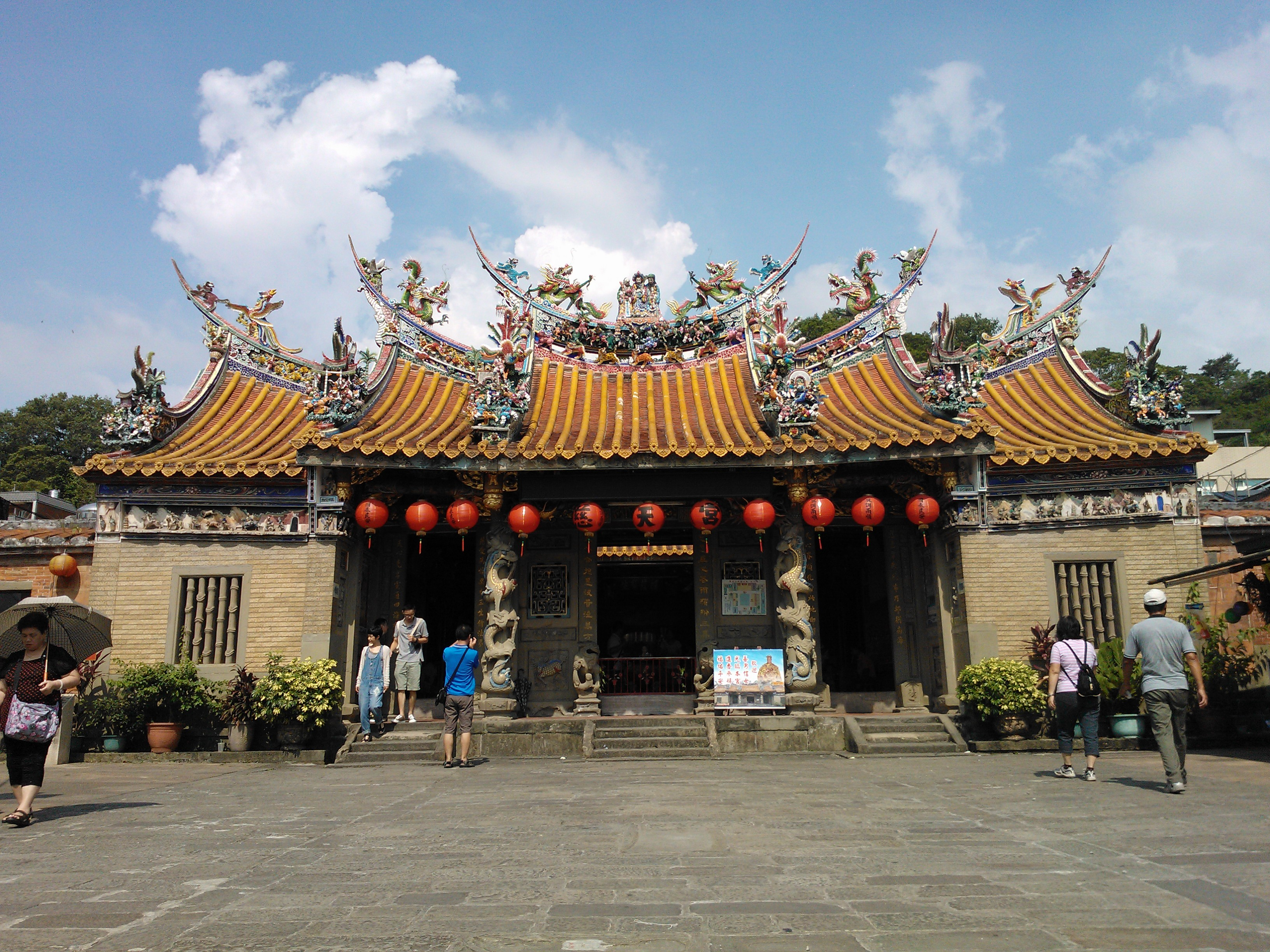

- Location within Hsinchu County

Religion
- Affiliation: Buddhism

Location
- Location: Beipu, Hsinchu County, Taiwan
- Coordinates: 24°41′59.1″N 121°03′29.7″E

Architecture
- Type: temple
- Completed: 1846

The Beipu Citian Temple (Chinese: 北埔慈天宮; pinyin: Běibù Cítiān Gōng) is a Buddhist temple in Beipu Township, Hsinchu County, Taiwan.

== History ==
The Taiwanese aborigines had been a fierce rebel force in the early days in the development of Beipu. In order to pray for peace within the local communities, a small temple dedicated to the Guanyin was built by farmers and developers in the area. The temple was reconstructed in wood in 1846, followed by an expansion to the scale it is today.

== See also ==
- Buddhism in Taiwan
- Religion in Taiwan
- List of temples in Taiwan
