= Dongshan railway station =

Railway station in Dongshan, Yilan County, Taiwan

Dongshan 冬山車站
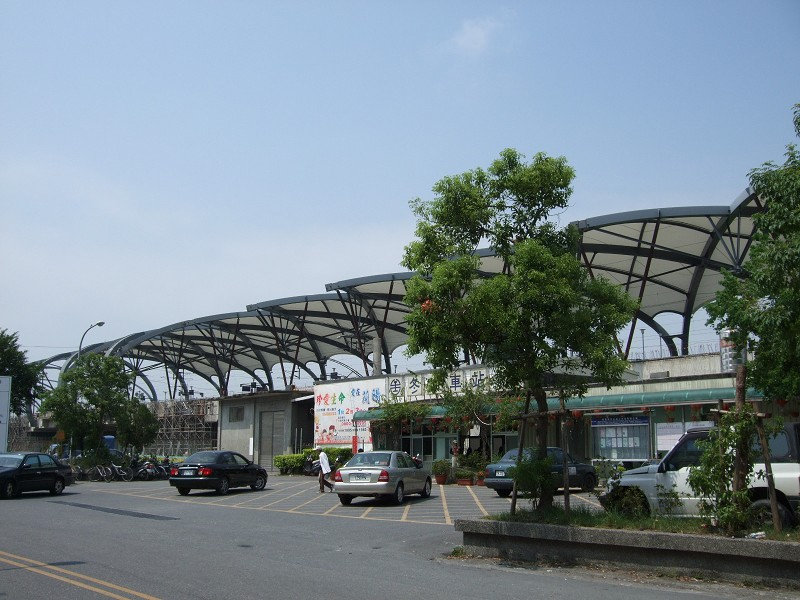

General information
- Location: Dongshan, Yilan County, Taiwan
- Coordinates: 24°38′10.56″N 121°47′31.14″E
- System: Train station
- Owner: Taiwan Railway Corporation
- Operator: Taiwan Railway Corporation
- Line: Eastern Trunk line
- Train operators: Taiwan Railway Corporation

History
- Opened: 24 March 1919

Passengers
- 1,152 daily (2024)

Services
Preceding station	Taiwan Railway	Following station
Luodong towards Badu	Eastern Trunk line	Xinma towards Taitung
Location

Dongshan (Chinese: 冬山車站; pinyin: Dōngshān Chēzhàn) is a railway station on the Taiwan Railway Yilan line located in Dongshan Township, Yilan County, Taiwan.

== History ==
The station was opened on 24 March 1919.

== Architecture ==
The station forms a shape of melon shack.

== See also ==
- List of railway stations in Taiwan
