= Fu Hsueh-peng =

Taiwanese politician (born 1951)

Fu Hsueh-peng (Chinese: 傅學鵬; born 4 April 1951) is a Taiwanese politician.

Fu began his political career as a member of the Kuomintang, and served on the Miaoli County Council as deputy speaker. He won two terms as magistrate of Miaoli County as an independent, defeating incumbent Ho Chi-hui in 1997, and winning reelection in 2001. During Fu's tenure as county magistrate, the first two Miaoli International Mask Festivals were held in 1999 and 2001. Fu also participated in festivals originating from his native Hakka culture. During a crackdown on black gold politics in 2000, Fu was indicted on charges related to misappropriation of public funds dating back to his tenure as deputy speaker of the Miaoli County Council.

Fu and Chen Chin-hsing were regarded as prominent Hakkas backing the 2000 presidential campaign of James Soong. However, after Hsu Ching-yuan left Soong's People First Party in November 2004, weeks before legislative elections were to take place, speculation that Fu would look to endorse candidates affiliated with the Democratic Progressive Party arose. During the 2005 magisterial election in Miaoli, Fu supported the DPP candidate Chiu Bing-kun because Chiu was Hakka. For the 2012 Taiwanese presidential election cycle, Fu backed Soong again, and was placed on the People First Party list for the concurrent legislative election. During the 2016 Taiwanese presidential election cycle, Soong visited Fu at his Gongguan Township residence and Fu commended Soong's tenure as governor of Taiwan Province.
