= Shangri-La Leisure Farm =

Farm in Dongshan, Yilan County, Taiwan

Shangri-La Leisure Farm 香格里拉休閒農場
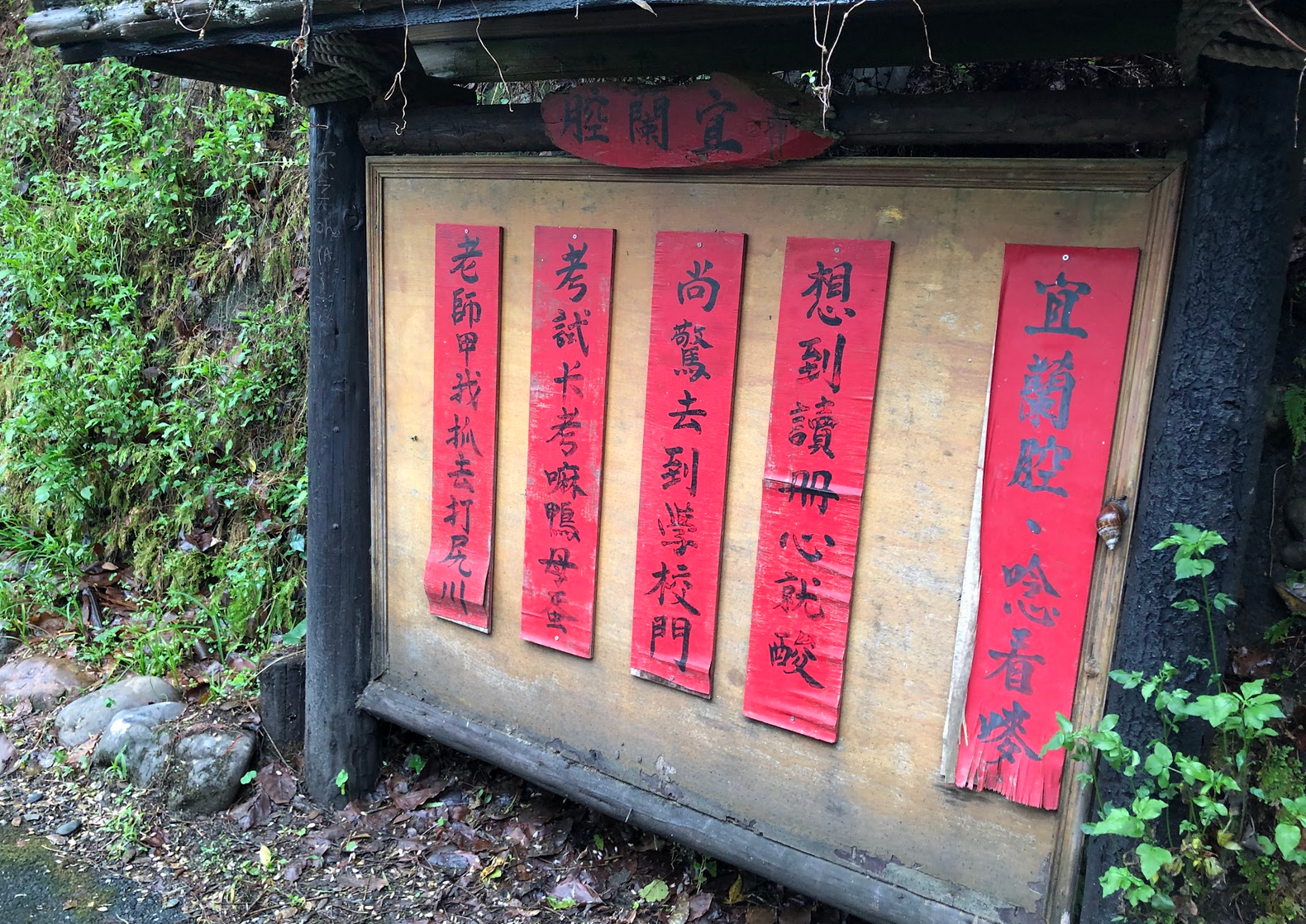
- Poem about the Yilan Hokkien accent at Shangri-La Leisure Farm
- Town/City: Dongshan, Yilan County, Taiwan
- Coordinates: 24°37′58″N 121°43′45″E
- Owner: Chin Lai-chang
- Area: 17 ha (42 acres)
- Website: Official website

The Shangri-La Leisure Farm (traditional Chinese: 香格里拉休閒農場; simplified Chinese: 香格里拉休闲农场; pinyin: Xiānggélǐlā Xiūxián Nóngchǎng) is a tourist attraction farm in Dajin Village, Dongshan Township, Yilan County, Taiwan.

== History ==
The resort originated back from a simple fruit orchard.

== Geology ==
The leisure farm is located about 250 meters above sea level with temperature conditions of four seasons. It overlooks valleys, rivers, plains, farms, islands and ocean. It has several natural ecology such as macaques, tree frogs, firebugs, butterflies and a variety of plants. It spans over an area of 17 hectares.

== Activities ==
The farm also regularly hosts several activities, such as lantern activity, whirligig activity, matzo ball activity and other do-it-yourself activity. It also houses some accommodation services for overnight stay or venues for business meetings.

== Transportation ==
The farm is accessible by taxi or bus from Luodong Station of Taiwan Railway.

== See also ==
- List of tourist attractions in Taiwan
