= Tai Chen-yao =

Taiwanese politician (1948–2017)

Tai Chen-yao MLY
- 戴振耀
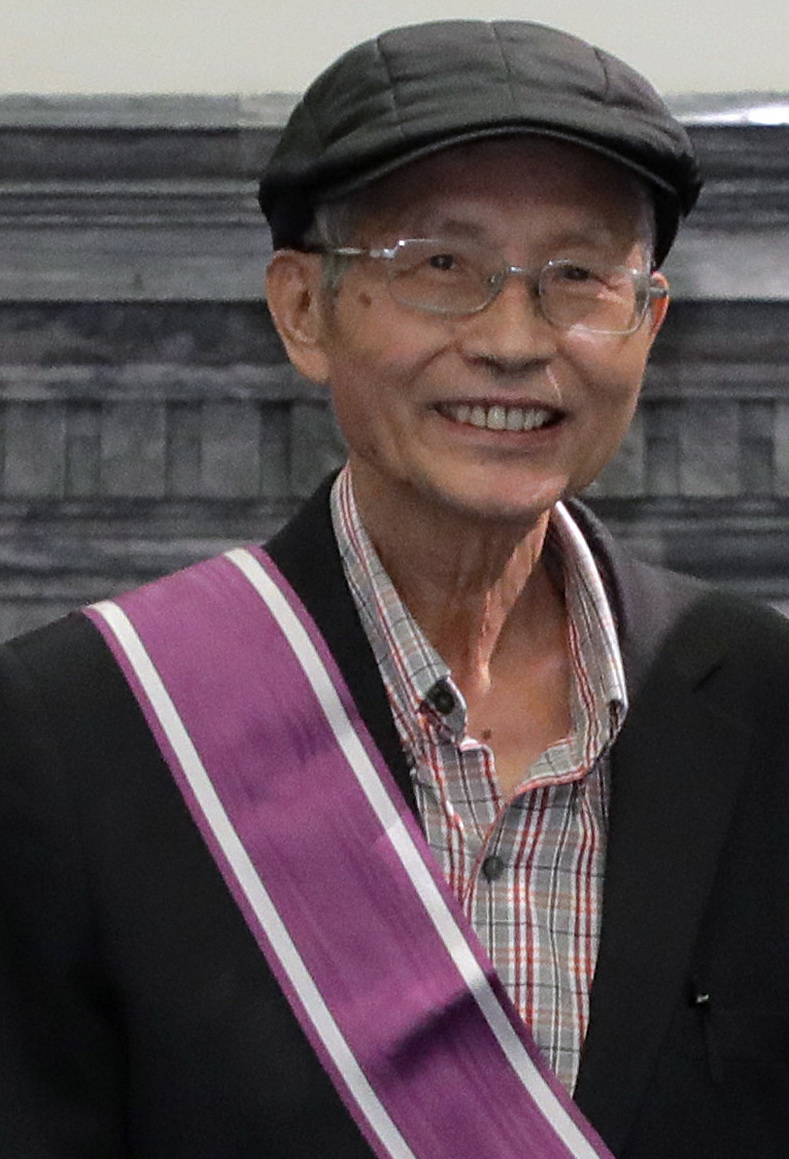
- Tai was awarded the Order of Brilliant Star in September 2017

Vice Minister of the Council of Agriculture
- In office 2003–2005
- Minister: Lee Chin-lung
- Succeeded by: Lin Kuo-hua

Member of the Legislative Yuan
- In office 1 February 1999 – 31 January 2002
- Constituency: Republic of China
- In office 1 February 1993 – 31 January 1996
- Constituency: Republic of China
- In office 1 February 1990 – 31 January 1993
- Constituency: Farmers

Personal details
- Born: 2 April 1948 Ciaotou, Kaohsiung, Taiwan
- Died: 19 November 2017 (aged 69) Kaohsiung, Taiwan
- Party: Democratic Progressive Party
- Education: University of San Diego

Tai Chen-yao (Chinese: 戴振耀; pinyin: Dài Zhènyào; 2 April 1948 – 19 November 2017) was a Taiwanese politician. He served three terms in the Legislative Yuan, from 1990 to 1996 and again from 1999 to 2002, and was later named vice chairman of the Council of Agriculture.

== Early life and education ==
Tai was born in Baishu, Ciaotou, Kaohsiung, on 2 April 1948. He attended schools in his native Kaohsiung and later studied at the University of San Diego. Taiwanese Hokkien was his first language.

== Career ==
In 1969, while Tai was completing his military service in Penghu, he supported the independent legislative campaign of Kuo Kuo-chi by distributing pamphlets. Tai was forced to stop within five minutes and subject to two weeks confinement, but not formally reported by his superior officer. Tai was subsequently employed by the Chinese Petroleum Corporation (CPC). In 1978, he ran for and won a seat on the Ciaotou Township Council, despite opposition from his Kuomintang-affiliated bosses at CPC. Tai, a farmer's rights and tangwai activist, was held at Hotel Saltwater, tried in a Taipei court, and imprisoned for three years for his actions during the Kaohsiung Incident in 1979. Upon his release, Tai organized a group of farmers from Ciaotou who became active advocates against the exploitation of farmers, drew attention to industrial pollution, and protested governmental actions during international trade negotiations that affected farmers. He was elected to the Legislative Yuan for the first time in 1989, representing the functional constituency for farmers. His candidacy was backed by the Farmers' Rights Association, the organization that led the 1988 farmers' rights protest in Taiwan. During that election cycle, Tai became the first candidate in 40 years to win election from the agricultural constituency without the support of the Kuomintang. In April 1992, Tai was injured in a physical altercation on the floor of the Legislative Yuan, which required hospitalization. In the December 1992 legislative elections, Tai retained his legislative seat as an at-large candidate on the party list of the Democratic Progressive Party. The DPP's New Tide faction supported his campaign for a second consecutive term. Tai served his third and final term on the Legislative Yuan from 1999 to 2002. By March 2003, Tai was vice chairman of the Council of Agriculture. In his COA position, Tai discussed conservation initiatives related to the black-faced spoonbill, the price of the 2003 rice crop, the rescue of stray dolphins in Tamsui River, and promoted Arbor Month and honey made from longan. Tai was formally sworn in as COA vice chairman in June 2004, after which he inspected damage from Typhoon Mindulle alongside premier Yu Shyi-kun. Upon learning that Formosan rock macaques were damaging crops, Tai stated in October 2004 that the Council of Agriculture would establish a task force to confront the issue. In April 2005, Tai cautioned Taiwanese farmers against exporting to China, as a formal agreement on tariffs had not yet been signed. Soon after the 2005 Pan-Blue visits to mainland China, Tai announced in June 2005 that the Council of Agriculture would be negotiating an agreement for the import of Taiwan-grown fruits to China.

== Legacy ==
Tai was awarded the Order of Brilliant Star in 2017, and died of pancreatic cancer on 19 November of that year, aged 69. The 2024 series Hotel Saltwater, a fictionalization of Tai's life, aired on Public Television Service.
