= Lin Kuang-hua =

Taiwanese politician (born 1945)

Lin Kuang-hua MLY
- 林光華
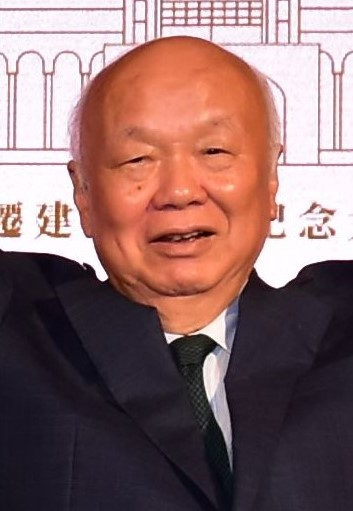

Governor of Taiwan Province
- In office 13 October 2003 – 25 January 2006
- Preceded by: Fan Kuang-chun
- Succeeded by: Jeng Peir-fuh (acting); Lin Hsi-yao

Hsinchu County Magistrate
- In office 20 December 1997 – 20 December 2001
- Preceded by: Fan Chen-tsung
- Succeeded by: Cheng Yung-chin

Member of the Legislative Yuan
- In office 1 February 1993 – 20 December 1997
- Succeeded by: Fan Chen-tsung
- Constituency: Hsinchu County

Personal details
- Born: 25 October 1945 (age 80) Hsinchu County, Taiwan
- Party: Democratic Progressive Party
- Education: National Taiwan Ocean University (BS)

Lin Kuang-hua (Chinese: 林光華; pinyin: Lín Guānghuá; Wade–Giles: Lin^{2} Kuang^{1}-hua^{2}; born 25 October 1945) is a Taiwanese politician. He served in the Legislative Yuan from 1993 to 1997, when he was elected to one term as Hsinchu County Magistrate. He chaired the Taiwan Provincial Government from 2003 to 2006.

Lin, a Hakka, is a member of the Democratic Progressive Party and also leads a Hsinchu County political faction named for him. He ran for a seat in the Legislative Yuan in 1992, and won again in 1995. However, he left the legislature in 1997 to run for the magistracy of Hsinchu County. The campaign against Cheng Yung-chin was contentious, and Cheng filed charges of defamation against Lin. Lin was convicted in October 1998. Upon appeal, the ruling was upheld by the Taiwan High Court in July 2000. Lin lost reelection to Cheng in 2001, and thought to be a potential candidate to lead the Council of Agriculture after the resignation of Fan Chen-tsung in 2002. Instead, Lin was named governor of Taiwan Province in 2003. He was the DPP candidate for the Hsinchu County magistracy in 2005, but again lost to Cheng in the local election. Following the loss, Lin left his position as Taiwan Provincial Government chairman in January 2006. The next year, he was questioned by the Supreme Prosecutors' Office in an investigation of alleged bribery dating back to 1997. Though initially acquitted by the Taipei District Court in January 2009, Lin was sentenced to eight years imprisonment upon appeal to the Taiwan High Court in September 2010.

== Personal life ==
Lin is married to Huang Yueh-hung.
