= Chen Chin-hsing =

Taiwanese lawyer and politician (1934–2025)

Chen Chin-hsing MLY
- 陳進興
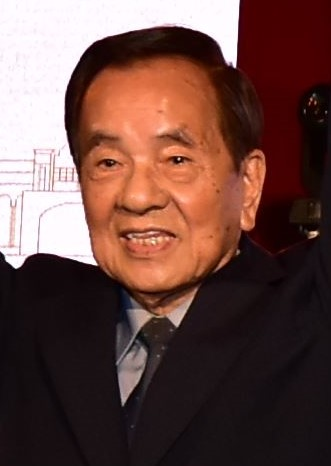

Member of the Legislative Yuan
- In office 1 February 2002 – 31 January 2005
- Constituency: Hsinchu County

Hsinchu County Magistrate
- In office 20 December 1981 – 20 December 1989
- Preceded by: Lin Pao-jen
- Succeeded by: Fan Chen-tsung

Personal details
- Born: 20 November 1934 Shinchiku Prefecture, Taiwan, Empire of Japan (today Hsinchu County, Taiwan)
- Died: 5 December 2025 (aged 90)
- Party: People First Party (since 2000)
- Other political affiliations: Kuomintang (until 2000)
- Education: National Taiwan University (LLB)

Chen Chin-hsing (Chinese: 陳進興; pinyin: Chén Jìnxìng; 24 December 1934 – 5 December 2025) was a Taiwanese lawyer and politician.

== Life and career ==
Chen studied law at National Taiwan University and worked as a schoolteacher and lawyer prior to the start of his political career. As a member of the Kuomintang, he served two terms as Hsinchu County Magistrate from 1981 to 1989. Chen then spent the next decade with the Taiwan Provincial Government. He supported James Soong's 2000 presidential campaign, and later served one term in the Legislative Yuan affiliated with the People First Party. While representing his native Hsinchu County district, Chen worked to pass the Unauthorized Filming Prevention Law to regulate the use of hidden cameras.

He was of Hakka descent. Chen died on 5 December 2025, at the age of 90.
