= Zhuang Jin-Cai =

Taiwanese traditional theatre musician (1935–2021)

Zhuang Jin-Cai (1935 – July 3, 2021) was a Taiwanese traditional theatre musician who was born in Dongshan Township, Yilan. He was the founder and head of the Hanyan Beiguan Troupe. He was also the winner of National Award for Arts, Yilan Cultural Awards, The Global Chinese Culture & Arts Award, and Folk Art Heritage Award.

== Biography ==
Born in Dongshan Township, Yilan in 1935, Zhuang began his career as a performer with his father, Zhuang Mu-Tu, in the Beiguan Troupe at a young age. At the age of 13, he officially joined the troupe and became proficient in the signature “Wind”, “Plucked”, “Bowed”, and “Percussion” instruments, earning recognition as an all-rounder in the field of Taiwanese traditional theatre.

In 1988, Zhuang founded the Hanyan Beiguan Troupe in Luodong, which performed both Beiguan opera and Taiwanese opera (Gezai opera).

The Hanyang Beiguan Opera Troupe was designated by the Council of Cultural Affairs of the Executive Yuan of Taiwan as one of the important traditional arts preservation groups in the Beiguan category in 2008.

Zhuang was employed as an adjunct professor at the Department of Traditional Music of Taipei National University of the Arts.

After his death on July 3, 2021, Zhuang was honored posthumously with the Presidential Citation by the Office of President, Republic of China.

== Awards ==
Year	Award	Category
1994	Folk Art Heritage Award by the Ministry of Education	
2000	The Global Chinese Culture & Arts Award	Folk music
2011	Yilan Cultural Awards	
2016	National Award for Arts	
