= Green World Ecological Farm =

Green World Ecological Farm 綠世界生態農場
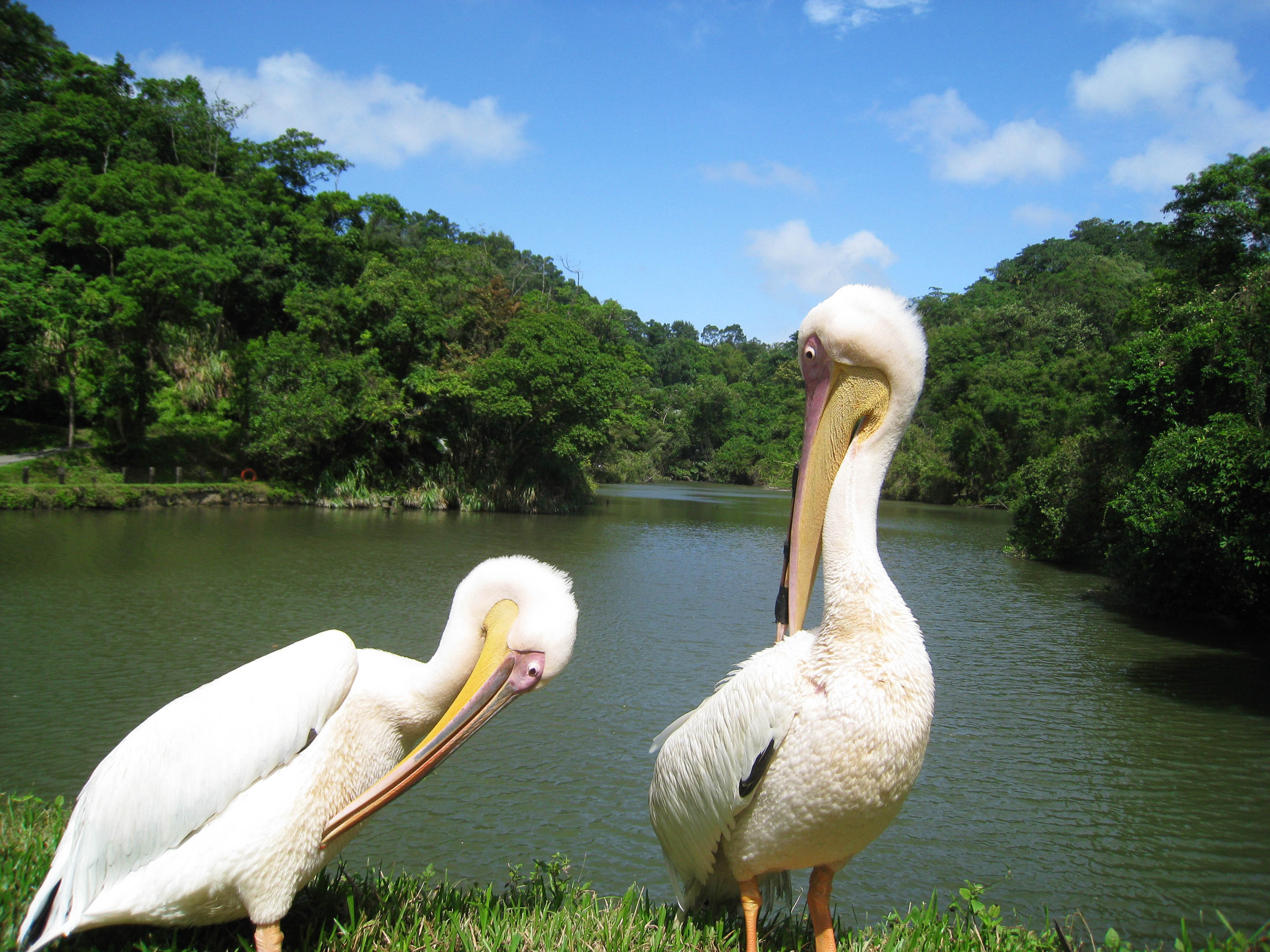
- Interactive map of Green World Ecological Farm 綠世界生態農場
- 24.6993°N 121.0671°E
- Date opened: 1 May 2004
- Location: Beipu, Hsinchu County, Taiwan
- Land area: 70 ha (170 acres)
- No. of species: 2,250
- Annual visitors: 800,000
- Website: www.green-world.com.tw

Green World Ecological Farm (Chinese: 綠世界生態農場; pinyin: Lǜ Shìjiè Shēngtài Nóngchǎng) is a theme park in Beipu Township, Hsinchu County, Taiwan that focuses on ecological education.

Covering 70 hectares (170 acres), the park includes an educational farm, a house, a zoo, and a botanical garden that occupies about 173 acres (70 ha) and hosts over 2,000 species of plants and animals. Green World is divided into six themed areas: Discovery Land, Bird Ecological Park, Butterfly Ecological Park, Water Plants Park, Biodiversity Adventure Area, and the Swan Lake Area. Around 800,000 visitors are estimated to visit the park every year.

The park claims to preserve most of the site's original landscapes and habitats and to have been built according to ecological engineering methods.

Although the name suggests that Green World is an ecological farm, it does not strictly follow the definition of ecological farming or produce any type of food. The park also serves as an accredited animal sanctuary for wounded or abandoned animals.

== History ==
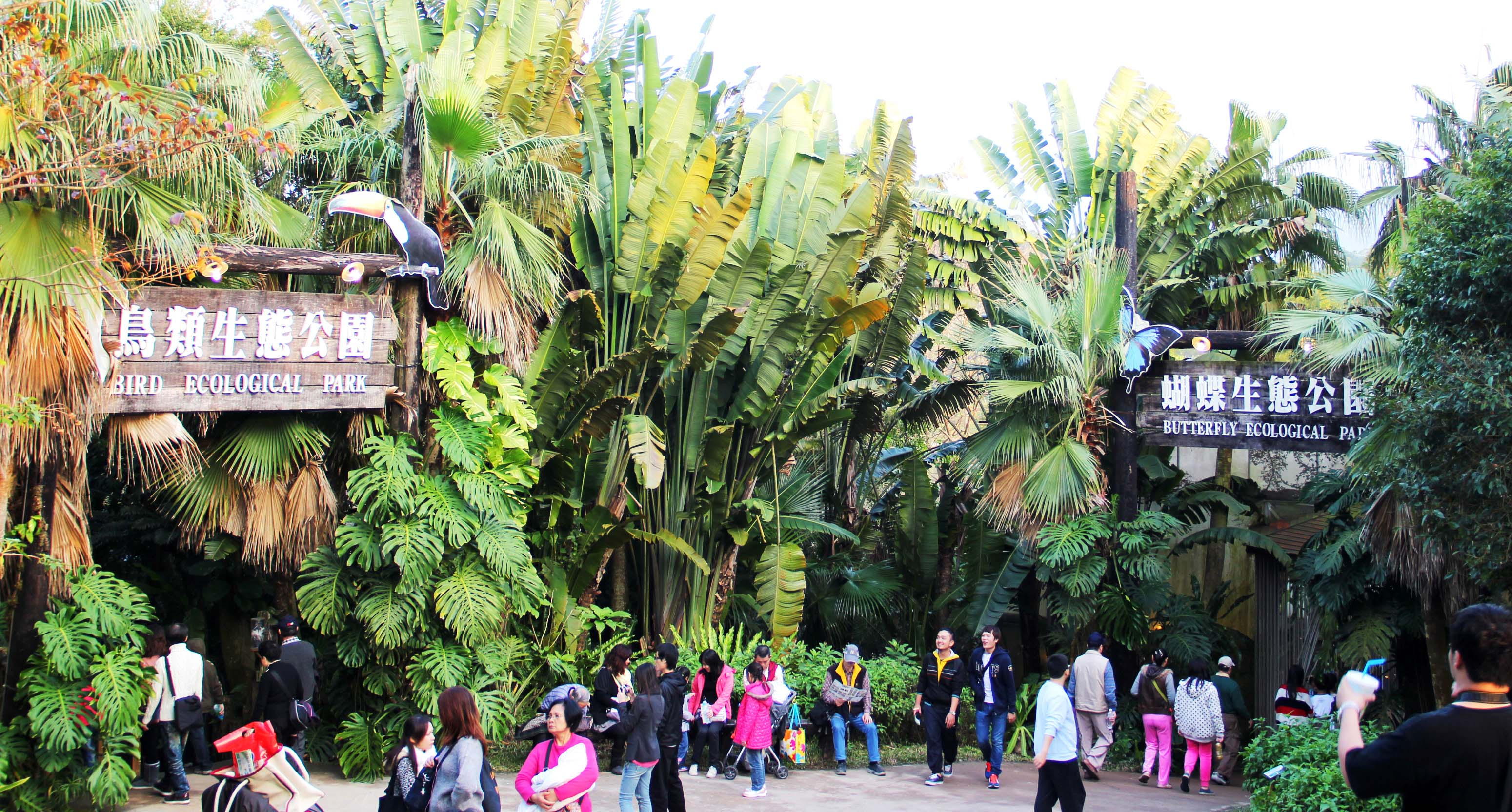
The Bird Park Entrance of Green World Ecological Farm

Green World is an ecological farm (Note: In Taiwan, the term "ecological farm" is used to indicate an area dedicated to the general idea of ecological education. It is usually not related to food production, organic farming, or any type of research-based farming activities. An "ecological farm" can be owned and/or managed by either a private company or the government) run by Amazon World Co. Ltd. The construction of the park started in 1999 and finished in 2004. It received a Taiwan Leisure Farm License (Note: . "Leisure Farm (生態園區)" is a term used by the Council of Agriculture for areas designated to boosting "agricultural tourism.") from the Council of Agriculture on 13 January 2004. The farm was officially opened to the public on 1 May 2004, originally with five of its six themed areas ("theme parks"). In July 2007, the sixth themed area, the Biodiversity Adventure Area, was opened.

== Themed areas ==
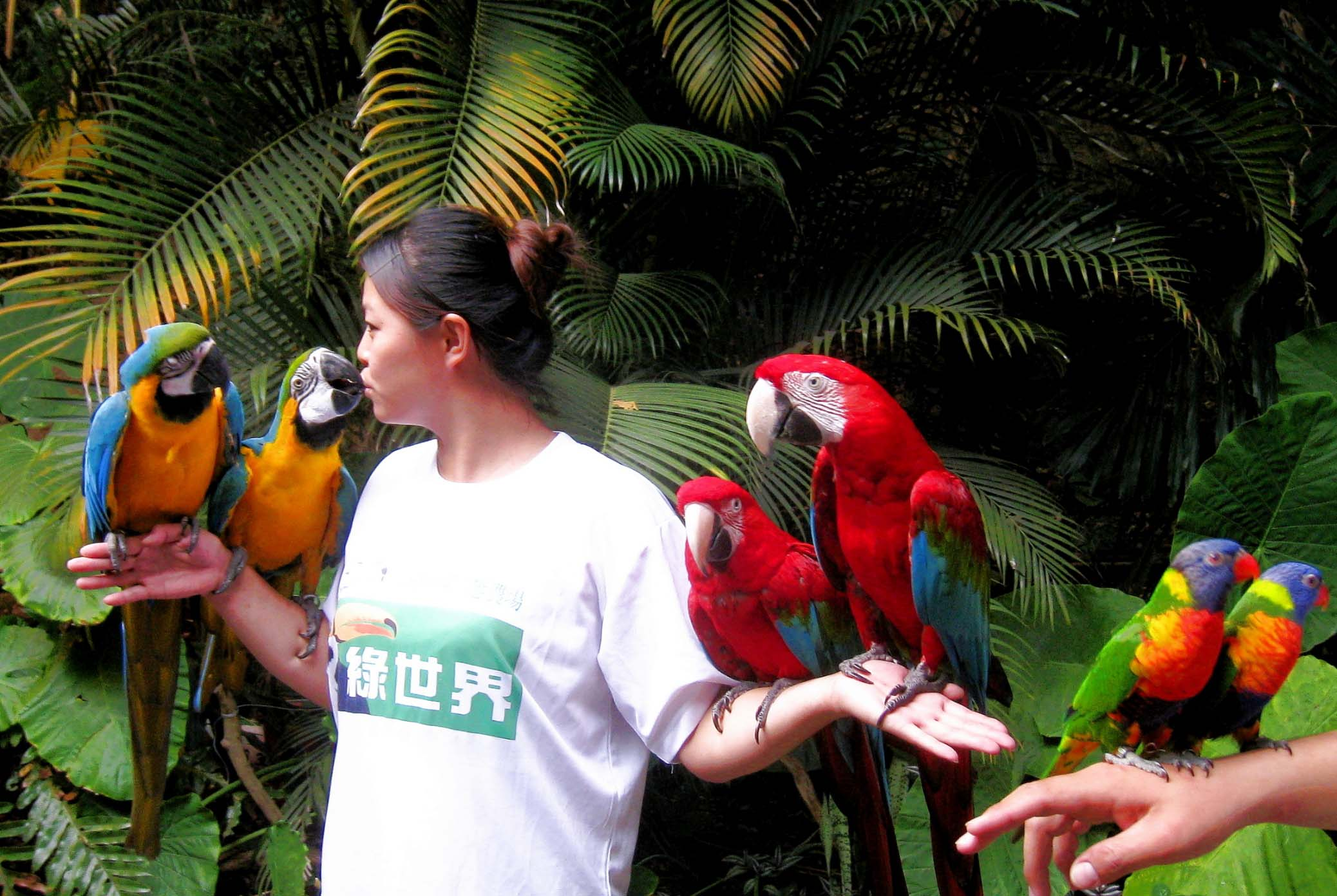
Macaws in Green World

Green World is composed of six themed areas. These themed areas are called "theme parks (主題公園)," and, though similar, are not equivalent to theme parks.

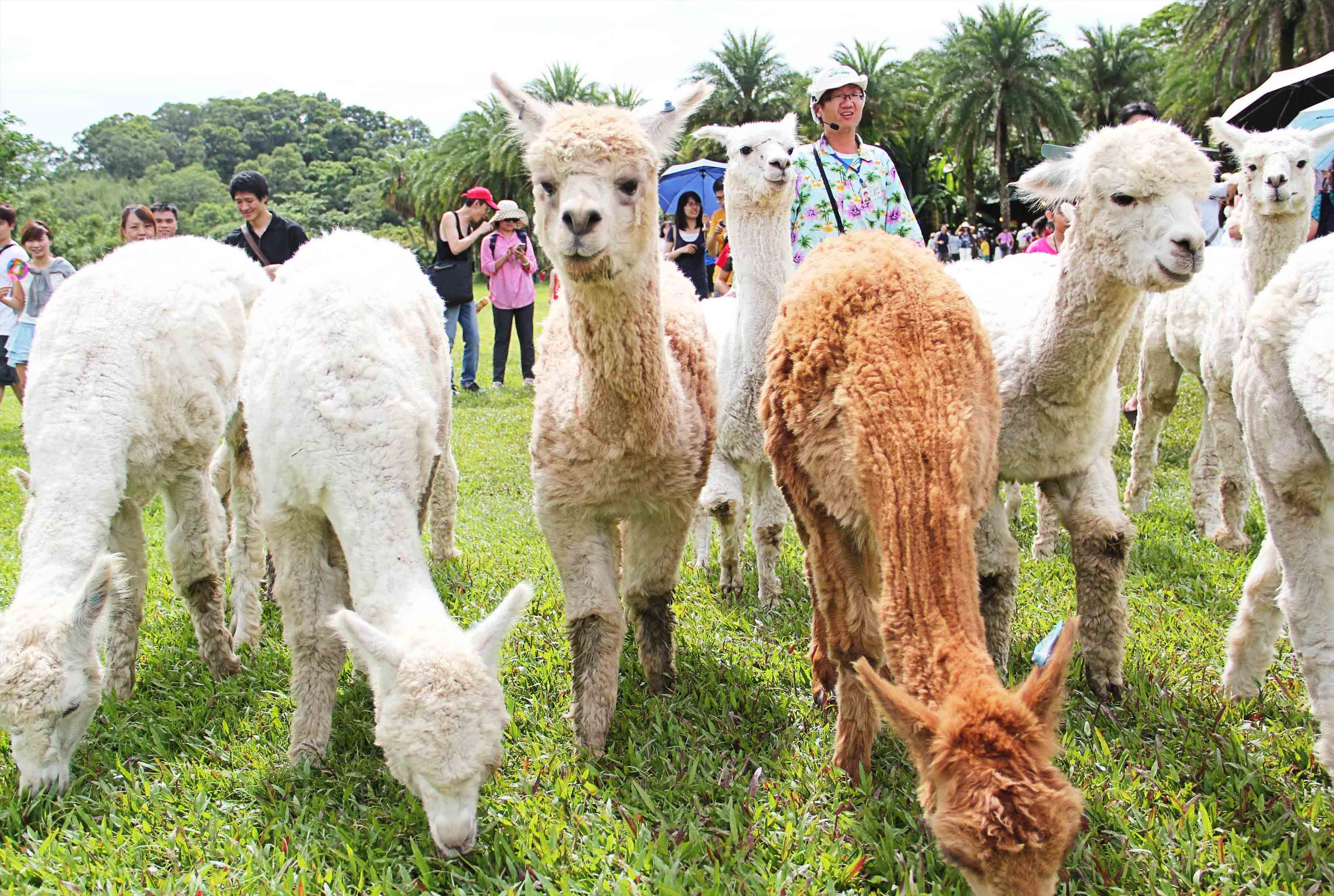
Alpaca Walking Hour in Green World Ecological Farm

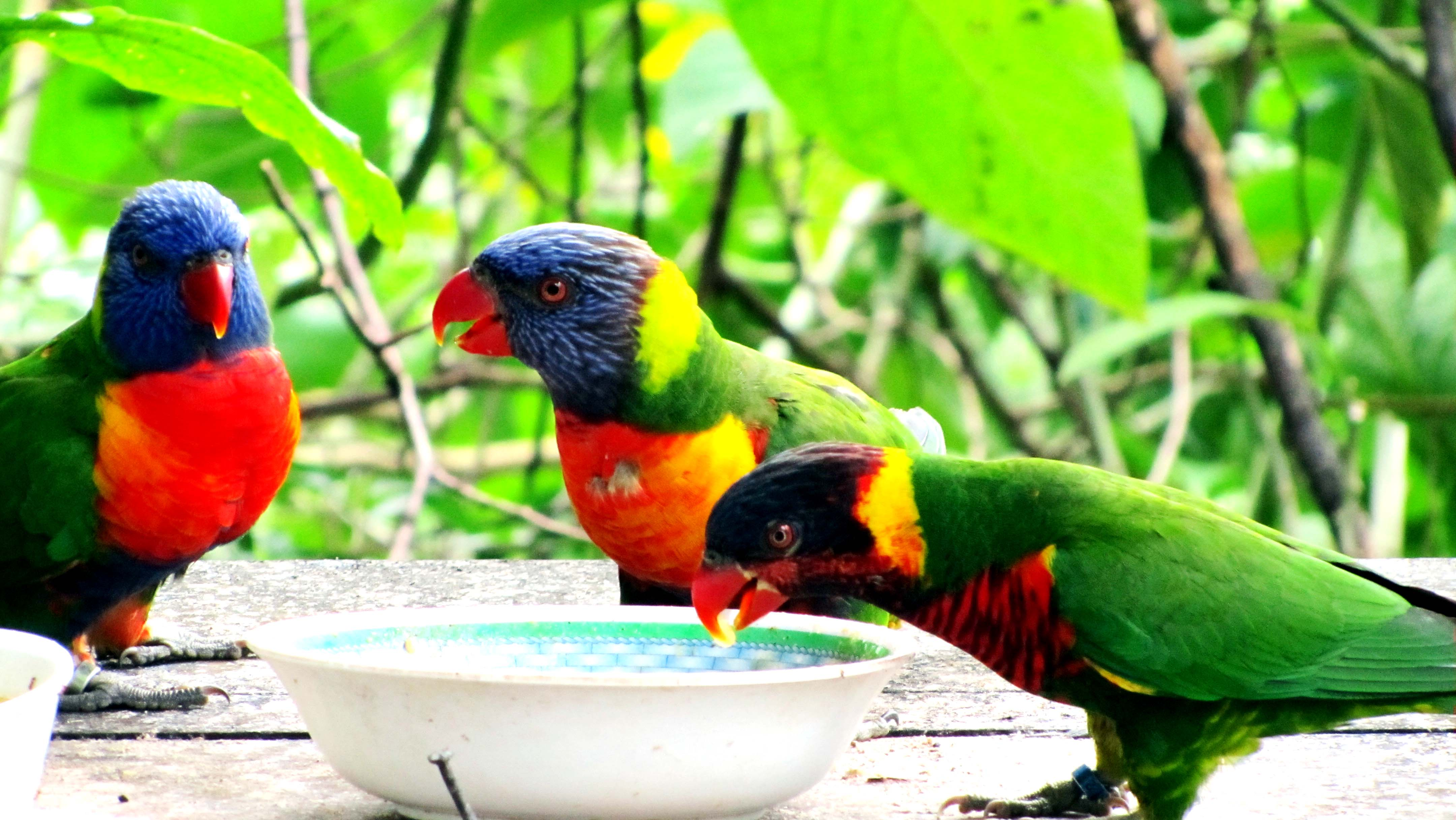
Fruit time for parrots in Green World Ecological Farm

- Discovery Land

Includes: Lovely Animal Area, Sportive Plants Area, Taiwan Native Fern Area, Orchid Land (Taiwan Native Orchid / World Orchid), Air Plants Area, Herbs Area, Cactus & Succulent Green House, Amazon Rainforest Area, Magic Seeds Area, Carnivorous Plants Area, Rainforest Café, Porcupine Home, and the Poisonous Plants Area.

- Bird Ecological Park

Home to over 100 species of birds, including: macaws, birds-of-paradise, great curassows, blue-crowned pigeons, green turacos, channel-billed toucans, toco toucans, golden pheasants, vulturine guineafowl, wood ducks, emerald doves, violet turacos, Asian fairy bluebirds, red-and-yellow barbets, Taiwan sibias, finch-billed bulbuls and eclectus parrots.

- Butterfly Ecological Park

Includes: Insect World, Insect Interactive Zone, Beetles Area, Butterfly Breeding Room, Outdoor Butterflies Path, Outdoor Butterflies Garden and the Aquatic Insects Area.

- Water Plants Park

Includes: Water Plants Area (collection of 506 species of native and world water plants), International Conference Center, Landscape Toilet II & IV, Bees Museum, Waterplants Café, Tropical Curio Shop, Eastern Beauty Bridge, Hakka Ancient House Restaurant, Mountain Pass Gate and The Four Seasons Garden.

- Biodiversity Adventure Area

Includes: Reptiles & Amphibians Zone (collections include anacondas, reticulated pythons, Aldabra giant tortoises, snapping turtles, tree frogs and salamanders), Biodiversity Museum (including sloths, flamingos, squirrel monkeys and red-legged pademelons), Alpaca House (Alpaca Walking Hour), Green World Grassland Plaza and the Rainforest Sky Walk.

- Swan Lake Area

Includes: Bird Watching Area I & II, Lakeside Café, Visitor Center, Administration Center, Landscape Toilet I, CoCo Bar, Macaw Area, Animal Star Shows, Pelican Feeding Hour, Dino Souvenir Shop and Emu Area.

== Features ==
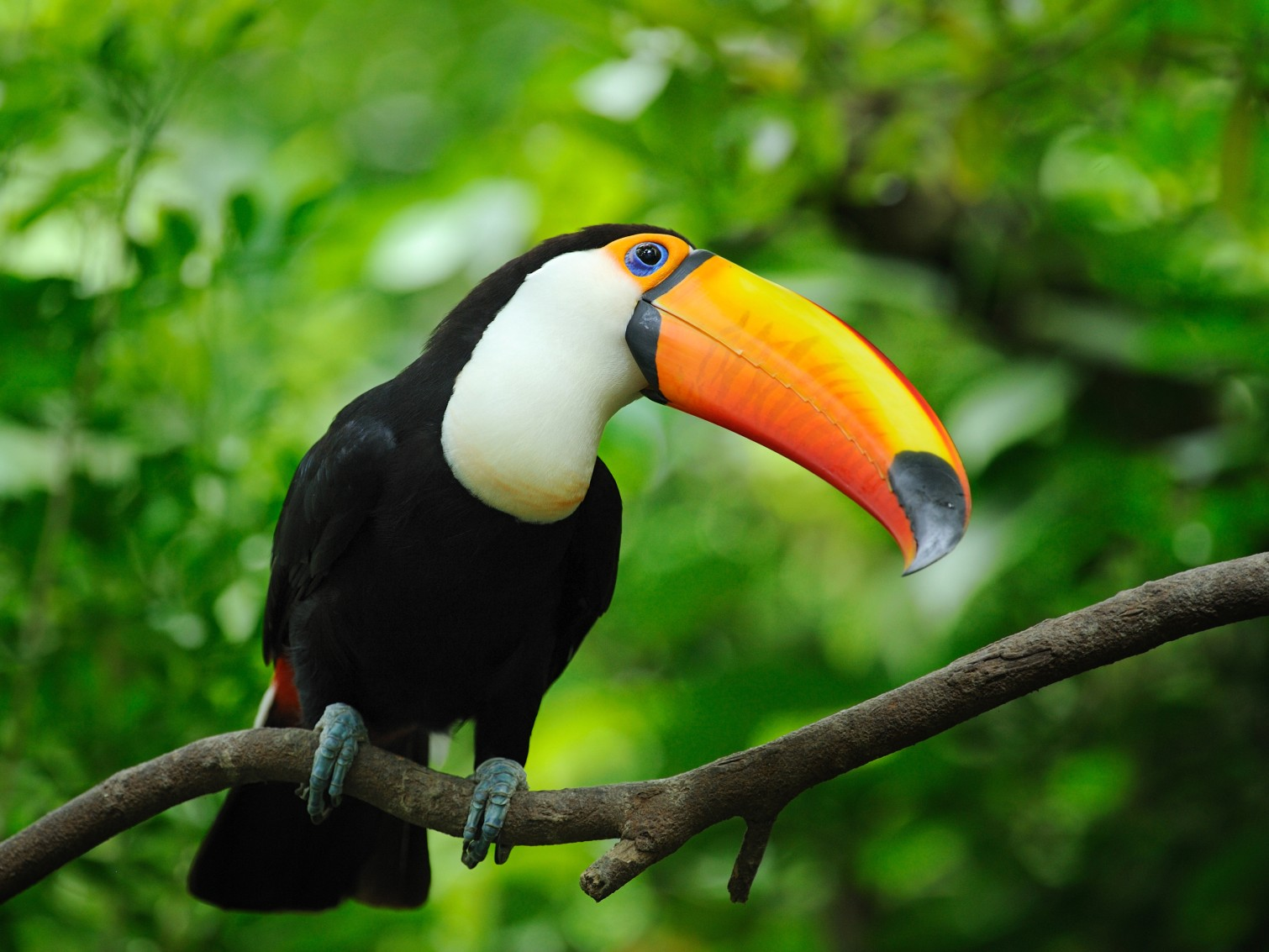
Toucan in Green World Ecological Farm Bird Park

=== Nature ===
Green World claims to preserve the original landscapes and habitats at the site. The parks serves as a temporary nursery for endangered indigenous species, including Taiwan yellow water lily, Taiwan quillwort and Formosan Reeve's muntjac. However, the more than 2,000 species of plants and animals the park hosts are mostly non-indigenous species. Green World also serves as an accredited animal sanctuary for wounded or abandoned animals.

=== Culture ===
Green World preserves a historic residential complex, ‘Kao Ping Tong.’ This ancient '3-in-1' complex was built by local Hakka people over 100 years ago. A number of antiques used by previous residents of the complex are on permanent exhibition within the complex.

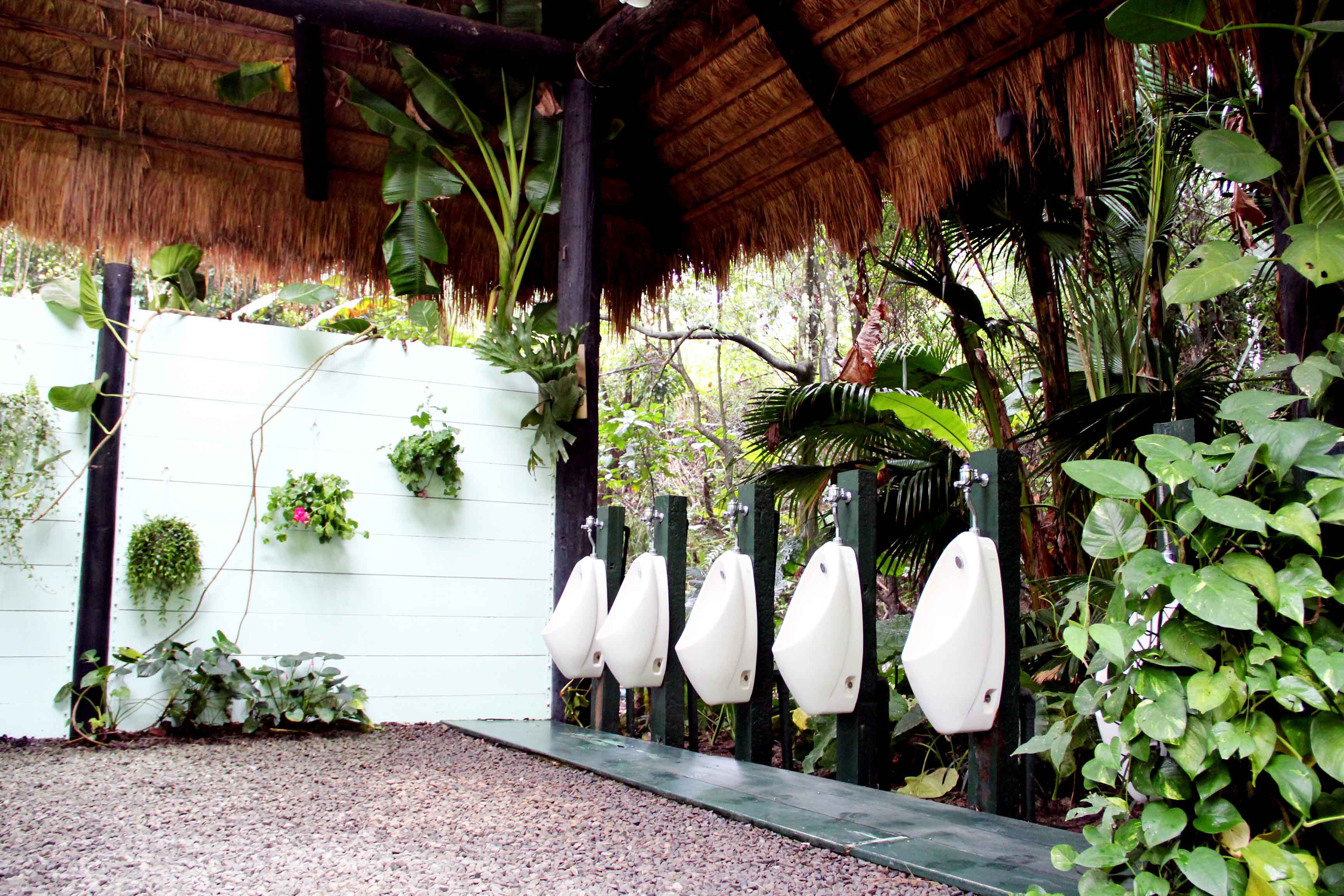
Landscape Toilet in Green World Ecological Farm

=== Facilities ===
Green World claims that the construction of the park is in accordance with ecological engineering methods and that the construction is done so that it produced the lowest possible carbon footprint. The park sees its use of natural air-convection and daylight illumination, as well as the water-saving devices implemented in its public restrooms, as a prominent achievement in being eco-friendly.

== See also ==
- List of tourist attractions in Taiwan
