= Perng Shaw-jiin =

Taiwanese legal scholar and politician

- 彭紹瑾
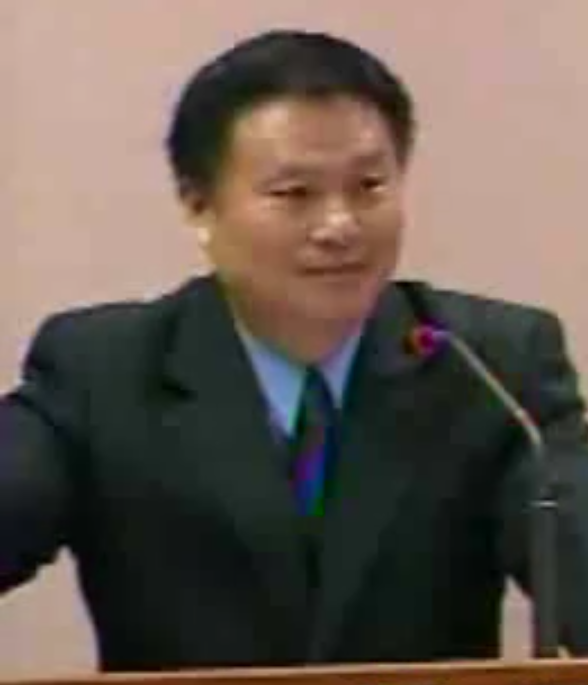

Deputy Chairperson of Fair Trade Commission of the Republic of China
- Incumbent
- Assumed office 1 February 2017
- Chairperson: Huang Mei-ying

Member of the Legislative Yuan
- In office 8 March 2010 – 1 February 2012
- Preceded by: Chiu Ching-chun
- Succeeded by: Hsu Hsin-ying
- Constituency: Hsinchu County
- In office 1 February 2005 – 1 February 2008
- Constituency: Taoyuan
- In office 1 February 1996 – 1 February 2002
- Constituency: Taoyuan

Personal details
- Born: 28 February 1957 (age 69) Beipu, Hsinchu County, Taiwan
- Party: Democratic Progressive Party
- Education: National Taiwan University (LLB); Soochow University (LLM); LMU Munich (PhD)

Perng Shaw-jiin (Chinese: 彭紹瑾; pinyin: Péng Shàojǐn; born 28 February 1957) is a Taiwanese legal scholar and politician.

== Education and early career ==
Perng graduated from National Taiwan University with a Bachelor of Laws (LL.B.) and earned a Master of Laws (LL.M.) from Soochow University. He then completed doctoral studies in Germany, where he earned his Ph.D. in law from LMU Munich in 1994. His doctoral dissertation was titled, "Theorie und Praxis des Parteiverbotssystems mit Blick auf seine Entwicklung in Deutschland".

After receiving his doctorate, Perng taught law at Soochow and Ming Chuan University and worked for the Taoyuan Public Prosecutor's Office in the early 1990s.

== Political career ==
Perng was first named to the Legislative Yuan in 1996, and stabbed by gang members his first year in office. He ran for Taoyuan County Magistrate in 2001, losing to Eric Chu. Perng returned to the Legislative Yuan from 2005 to 2008, before stepping down. The election of Chiu Ching-chun as Hsinchu County Magistrate in 2009 triggered a by-election for his legislative seat. Perng ran for the position and won by 15,283 votes. Perng represented Hsinchu County until 2012, when he was succeeded by Hsu Hsin-ying.
