= Kuo Jung-cheng =

Taiwanese politician (1950–2021)

Kuo Jung-cheng (Chinese: 郭榮振; 7 June 1950 – 7 July 2021) was a Taiwanese politician.

== Life and career ==
Kuo was born in Daan District, Taichung, and attended Chih-Yung Senior High School (of Commerce) in Dajia District. After completing upper-level examinations in taxation and finance, he underwent military training at Naval Base San Diego and attended the University of Southern California.

After his return to Taiwan, Kuo worked for a pharmaceutical company, then began his career in politics affiliated with the Kuomintang's Taichung-based blue faction. He served two terms on the Taichung County Council from 1989 to 1998. During the 1997 Taiwanese local elections, Kuo contested the Taichung County magistracy, splitting the pan-blue vote with fellow Kuomintang member Shyu Jong-shyong, allowing Liao Yung-lai to win the office. Kuo won a seat in the Legislative Yuan in 1998, representing Taichung County, a district later held by his close friend Yen Ching-piao. Kuo stepped down from the Legislative Yuan after the end of his term in 2002, and died on 7 July 2021 of liver cancer.
