= Lin Kuo-hua =

Taiwanese politician (1935–2016)

Lin Kuo-hua (Chinese: 林國華; 19 September 1935 – 27 July 2016) was a Taiwanese politician.

== Early life ==
Lin was born in Gukeng, Yunlin, in 1935. He attended Taichung Municipal Taichung First Senior High School and completed a degree in civil engineering at National Taiwan University.

== Activism and political career ==
Lin was active in the farmers' rights movement, and headed the 1988 farmers' rights protest in Taiwan, as well as a similar protest in 1993. He was elected to the Legislative Yuan as a representative of Yunlin County affiliated with the Democratic Progressive Party for the first time in 1998, and won a second term in 2001. During his unsuccessful reelection bid in 2004, Lin was investigated for bribery, as were fellow candidates Ho Chin-sung and Chen Chiang-sun. In 2005, Lin lost a party primary for the Yunlin County magistracy election to Su Chih-fen. He was later appointed vice chairman of the Council of Agriculture (COA). While serving within the COA, Lin was named a trustee of the Straits Exchange Foundation in September 2006.

== Personal life ==
Lin was married to Huang Fu-mei, who was a member of the National Assembly. Their daughter Lin Hui-ju served as mayor of Gukeng and on the Yunlin County Council. In January 2007, Lin Kuo-hua underwent surgery to remove blood clots from his brain. Lin died on 27 July 2016.
