= List of county magistrates of Hsinchu =

The magistrate of Hsinchu County is the chief executive of the government of Hsinchu County. This list includes directly elected magistrates of the county. The incumbent Magistrate is Yang Wen-ke of Kuomintang since 25 December 2018.

== Directly elected County Magistrates ==
Kuomintang Independent Democratic Progressive Party

No.	Portrait	Name (Birth–Death)	Term of Office		Political Party	Term
1		Chu Sheng-chi 朱盛淇; Zhū Shèngqí	1 May 1951	2 June 1954	Kuomintang	1
1		Chu Sheng-chi 朱盛淇; Zhū Shèngqí	1 May 1954	2 June 1957	Kuomintang	2
2		Tsou Ti-chih 鄒滌之; Zōu Dízhī	2 June 1957	2 June 1960	Kuomintang	3
3		Peng Jui-lu 彭瑞鷺; Péng Ruìlù	2 June 1960	2 June 1964	Kuomintang	4
3		Peng Jui-lu 彭瑞鷺; Péng Ruìlù	2 June 1964	2 June 1968	Kuomintang	5
4		Liu Hsieh-hsun 劉榭燻; Liú Xièxūn	2 June 1968	1 February 1973	Independent	6
5		Lin Pao-jen 林保仁; Lín Bǎorén	1 February 1973	20 December 1977	Kuomintang	7
5		Lin Pao-jen 林保仁; Lín Bǎorén	20 December 1977	20 December 1981	Kuomintang	8
6		Chen Chin-hsing 陳進興; Chén Jìnxīng (1933-2025)	20 December 1981	20 December 1985	Kuomintang	9
6		Chen Chin-hsing 陳進興; Chén Jìnxīng (1933-2025)	20 December 1985	20 December 1989	Kuomintang	10
7		Fan Chen-tsung 范振宗; Fàn Zhènzōng (1942-)	20 December 1989	20 December 1993	Democratic Progressive Party	11
7		Fan Chen-tsung 范振宗; Fàn Zhènzōng (1942-)	20 December 1993	20 December 1997	Democratic Progressive Party	12
8		Lin Kuang-hua 林光華; Lín Guānghuá (1945-)	20 December 1997	20 December 2001	Democratic Progressive Party	13
9		Cheng Yung-chin 鄭永金; Zhèng Yǒngjīn (1949-)	20 December 2001	20 December 2005	Kuomintang	14
9		Cheng Yung-chin 鄭永金; Zhèng Yǒngjīn (1949-)	20 December 2005	20 December 2009	Kuomintang	15
		Cheng Yung-chin 鄭永金; Zhèng Yǒngjīn (1949-)	20 December 2005	20 December 2009	Independent	15
10		Chiu Ching-chun 邱鏡淳; Qiū Jìngchún (1949-)	20 December 2009	25 December 2014	Kuomintang	16
10		Chiu Ching-chun 邱鏡淳; Qiū Jìngchún (1949-)	25 December 2014	25 December 2018	Kuomintang	17
11		Yang Wen-ke 楊文科; Yáng Wénkē (1951-)	25 December 2018	25 December 2022	Kuomintang	18
11		Yang Wen-ke 楊文科; Yáng Wénkē (1951-)	25 December 2022	Incumbent	Kuomintang	19
