= Ho Chin-sung =

Taiwanese politician

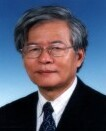

Ho Chin-sung (Chinese: 何金松; born 5 November 1942) is a Taiwanese politician.

== Career ==
Ho Chin-sung was active in the Chiayi County chapter of the Democratic Progressive Party, worked for Ho Chia-jung, and served on the Chiayi County Council for two consecutive terms prior to his election to the Legislative Yuan, representing Chiayi County on behalf of the DPP. He left the Democratic Progressive Party to join the Non-Partisan Solidarity Union in 2004, and ran for reelection as an NPSU candidate. Ho was indicted on charges of bribery in November 2004, after a three-year investigation had concluded.
