= Liao Feng-teh =

- 廖風德
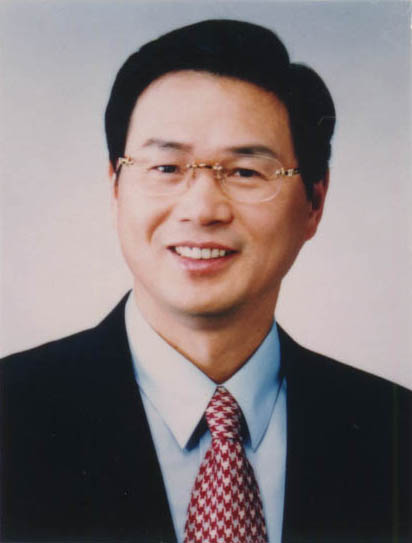

Member of the Legislative Yuan
- In office 1 February 1999 – 31 January 2005
- Constituency: Yilan County

Director of the Office of the Vice President of the Republic of China
- In office 1997–1999
- Vice President: Lien Chan

Personal details
- Born: 17 April 1951 Dongshan, Yilan County, Taiwan
- Died: 10 May 2008 (aged 57) Muzha District, Taipei, Taiwan
- Party: Kuomintang
- Education: Tamkang University (BA); National Chengchi University (MA, PhD)

Liao Feng-teh (Chinese: 廖風德; pinyin: Liaò Fēngdé; Pe̍h-ōe-jī: Liāu Hong-tek; 17 April 1951 – 10 May 2008) was a Taiwanese politician and historian. Affiliated with the Kuomintang (KMT), he was a member of the Legislative Yuan from 1999 to 2005.

Liao was chosen to become the Interior Minister designate in 2008 under Republic of China President Ma Ying-jeou, following Ma's victory in the Taiwanese Presidential Election of 2008. However, Liao, Deputy Secretary-General of the Kuomintang, died of cardiopulmonary failure while hiking on May 10, 2008, before he could take office.

== Early life and education ==
Liao was born in Tungshan Township in Yilan County, Taiwan. After high school, he graduated from Tamkang University with a B.A. in history in 1972. He then earned a Master of Arts (M.A) in journalism in 1976 and a Ph.D. in history in 1990, both from National Chengchi University. His doctoral dissertation was titled, "Student Movements and Post-War Chinese Politics (1945–1949)" (Chinese: 學潮與戰後中國政治 (1945–1949)).

== Early career ==
Liao worked as a reporter for the China Daily News, a Chinese language daily newspaper, which is run by the KMT. He also worked as a novelist and playwright before entering politics within the KMT.

== Political career ==
Liao Feng-teh worked as the director of the office of the then vice president of the Republic of China Lien Chan from 1997 until 1999. He then served as a legislator in the Legislative Yuan from 1999 until 2005.

Laio had served as the director of the Kuomintang's Organizational Development Committee since 2004. He oversaw eight successful election campaigns for the KMT from 2004 until the Presidential election in 2008.

Following the 2008 election victory of Taiwanese President Ma Ying-jeou, was chosen as the country's new interior minister designate. He would have taken office with the new KMT controlled government on May 20, 2008.

== Death ==
Liao was found unconscious by hikers on a mountain path near his home in Muzha, near the intersection of Wannin Street and Jungong Road on the outskirts of Taipei, at 4:05 P.M. on May 10, 2008. He had suffered from massive cardiopulmonary failure. Liao was rushed to Wan Fang Hospital where doctors attempted to resuscitate for five hours. Officials from the incoming KMT government rushed to the hospital upon hearing the news, including President Ma Ying-jeou, Vice President Vincent Siew and KMT Chairman Wu Po-hsiung, Premier Liu Chao-shiuan and other members of the new cabinet. However, Liao Feng-teh was pronounced dead at 9:05 PM on May 10, 2008, at the age of 57.
