= Cheng Yung-chin =

Taiwanese politician

Cheng Yung-chin MLY
- 鄭永金
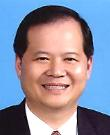

Speaker of Taiwan Provincial Consultative Council
- In office 21 December 2016 – 30 June 2018
- Preceded by: Lee Yuan-chuan
- Succeeded by: Position abolished

Magistrate of Hsinchu County
- In office 20 December 2001 – 20 December 2009
- Preceded by: Lin Kuang-hua
- Succeeded by: Chiu Ching-chun

Member of the Legislative Yuan
- In office 1 February 1996 – 20 December 2001
- Constituency: Hsinchu County

Deputy Speaker of the Hsinchu County Council
- In office 1986–1994

Personal details
- Born: 8 October 1949 (age 76) Zhudong, Hsinchu County, Taiwan
- Party: Independent
- Other political affiliations: Kuomintang (until 2009)
- Education: Ta Hwa University of Science and Technology (BS); Chinese Culture University (MA); Chung Hua University (MS)

Cheng Yung-chin (Chinese: 鄭永金; pinyin: Zhèng Yǒngjīn; Wade–Giles: Chêng^{4} Yung^{3}-chin^{1}; born 8 October 1949) is a Taiwanese politician.

== Personal life and education ==
Cheng is of Hakka descent, and is married to Song Li-hua. His brother is Cheng Yung-tang.

After high school, Cheng earned a B.S. from Ta Hwa University of Science and Technology, an M.A. in political science from Chinese Culture University, and an M.S. in technology management from Chung Hua University.

== Political career ==
Chen was the deputy speaker of the Hsinchu County Council from 1986 to 1994. The next year Cheng won a seat in the Legislative Yuan. He faced Lin Kuang-hua for the first time in the Hsinchu County magistracy election of 1997. Cheng lost a contentious campaign, but managed to win reelection to the legislature in 1998. Shortly after the 1999 Jiji earthquake, Cheng supported the visit of Trinley Thaye Dorje, a Tibetan Buddhist leader, to Taiwan. For a portion of his tenure in the legislature, Cheng served as Kuomintang caucus whip. Cheng did not complete his second legislative term, as he was nominated the KMT candidate for the magistracy of Hsinchu County. Subsequently, Cheng defeated Lin twice, serving as Hsinchu County Magistrate from 2001 to 2009. In August 2006, the Hsinchu District Prosecutor's Office indicted Cheng on charges of bribery and corruption. In light of the legal proceedings, his Kuomintang membership was suspended. Cheng supported Chang Pi-chin, a former KMT member running an independent campaign for Hsinchu County Magistrate, in 2009. As a result, Cheng's own party membership was revoked.

Cheng declared his independent candidacy for the 2014 Hsinchu County magistracy election, but lost despite the support of former rival Lin Kuang-hua and the Democratic Progressive Party.

2014 Hsinchu County Magistrate Election Result
No.	Candidate	Party	Votes	Percentage
1	Yeh Fang-tung (葉芳棟)	Independent	15,699	5.93%
2	Chiu Ching-chun	KMT	124,309	46.94%
3	Cheng Yung-chin	Independent	118,698	44.82%
4	Chuang Tso-bin (莊作兵)	Independent	6,115	2.31%

The next year, Chen launched an independent legislative bid for Hsinchu County Constituency, supported by the DPP and the Hsinchu County Cheng family political faction. However, Cheng lost to Lin Wei-chou.

Legislative Election 2016: Hsinchu County district
Party	Candidate	Votes	%	±%
Kuomintang	Lin Wei-chou	93,495	36.75	
Independent	Cheng Yung-chin	85,170	33.48	
Minkuotang	Chiu ching-ya	63,512	24.96	
Others	Zhuo Enzong	5,442	2.14	
Independent	Huang Xiulong	2,776	1.09	
Others	Su Wenying	1,603	0.63	
Others	Li Zonghua	1,520	0.60	
Others	Fan Zhenkui	909	0.36	
Majority		8,325	3.35	
Total valid votes		254,427	96.83	
Rejected ballots		8,331	3.17	
Minkuotang gain from Kuomintang		Swing		
Turnout		262,758	66.27	
Registered electors		396,492		
