= Lin Szu-ming =

Taiwanese politician

Member Lin Szu-ming

Lin Szu-ming (Chinese: 林思銘; born 15 March 1966) is a Taiwanese politician. He was a member of the Hsinchu County Council from 2001 to 2020, when he was elected to the Legislative Yuan, representing Hsinchu County Constituency 2 on behalf of the Kuomintang.

== Education and early career ==
Lin is a Hsinchu County native, born on 15 March 1966. After studying law at Soochow University, he joined the Mingdian law firm.

== Political career ==
Lin was first elected to the Hsinchu County Council in 2001, and retained his seat through 2020, departing in the midst of his fifth term as county councillor, to take office as a member of the Legislative Yuan.
