= Liao Yung-lai =

Taiwanese politician (born 1956)

Liao Yung-lai (Chinese: 廖永來; born 1 August 1956) is a Taiwanese politician.

== Early life and education ==
Liao Yung-lai was born in Erlin, Changhua, on 1 August 1956. He attended Taiwan Provincial Junior Teachers College in Taichung and worked as a teacher. Liao adopted the pseudonym Liao Mo-bai as a poet. He was also an environmentalist.

== Career ==
Liao was a member of the second Legislative Yuan from 1993 to 1996, representing Taichung County. During the 1997 local elections, he supported educational reform, and worked alongside the Humanistic Education Foundation to achieve this goal. Liao won the Taichung County magistracy in November 1997 against five other candidates. During Liao's magistracy, the 1999 Jiji earthquake dealt damage to the counties of Nantou and Taichung. He encouraged Taichung County residents to donate food, money, and supplies to earthquake victims. He later advocated for more volunteer rescuers, but warned them to stay clear of heavily damaged locations. Following the rescue of two children in Dali, Taichung, Liao extended county-wide rescue operations to a full 100 hours after the quake struck. In the following weeks, Liao began distributing housing compensation funds, met with Médecins Sans Frontières officials, and accepted aid from volunteers associated with the Humanistic Education Foundation. In 2000, Liao commented on the three links, opining that national security should be considered before establishing the connections. Liao yielded the magistracy to Huang Chung-sheng in 2001. He was later named director of the Central Taiwan Joint Services Center.
