= Chiu Ching-chun =

Politician of Taiwan

- 邱鏡淳
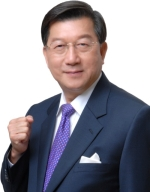

Magistrate of Hsinchu County
- In office 20 December 2009 – 25 December 2018
- Deputy: Yang Wen-ke
- Preceded by: Cheng Yung-chin
- Succeeded by: Yang Wen-ke

Member of the Legislative Yuan
- In office 1 February 1999 – 20 December 2009
- Succeeded by: Perng Shaw-jiin
- Constituency: Hsinchu County

Personal details
- Born: 8 December 1949 (age 76) Emei, Hsinchu County, Taiwan
- Party: Kuomintang
- Education: Minghsin University of Science and Technology (BS); National Chiao Tung University (BA); Tamkang University (BA); Tunghai University (MA); University of St. Thomas (MBA)

Chiu Ching-chun (traditional Chinese: 邱鏡淳; simplified Chinese: 邱镜淳; pinyin: Qiū Jìngchún; born 8 December 1949) is a Taiwanese politician. He was the Magistrate of Hsinchu County since 20 December 2009 until 25 December 2018.

== Education ==
Chiu obtained his bachelor's degree from Minghsin University of Science and Technology and earned additional bachelor's degrees from National Chiao Tung University and Tamkang University. He then earned a Master of Arts in public administration from Tamkang University and a Master of Business Administration (M.B.A.) from the University of St. Thomas in the United States.

== Hsinchu County magistracy ==
=== 2009 county magistracy election ===
Chiu assumed the magistracy of Hsinchu County on 20 December 2009 after winning the 2009 magisterial election as the Kuomintang candidate on 5 December 2009.

=== 2014 county magistracy election ===
In 2014, Chiu ran for reelection. He faced independent candidate Cheng Yung-chin, who had served as magistrate from 2001 to 2009. Chiu won the election.

2014 Hsinchu County Magistrate Election Result
No.	Candidate	Party	Votes	Percentage
1	Yeh Fang-tung (葉芳棟)	Independent	15,699	5.93%
2	Chiu Ching-chun	KMT	124,309	46.94%
3	Cheng Yung-chin	Independent	118,698	44.82%
4	Chuang Tso-bin (莊作兵)	Independent	6,115	2.31%

=== 2016 Mainland China visit ===
In September 2016, Chiu with another seven magistrates and mayors from Taiwan visited Beijing, which were Hsu Yao-chang (Magistrate of Miaoli County), Liu Cheng-ying (Magistrate of Lienchiang County), Yeh Hui-ching (Deputy Mayor of New Taipei City), Chen Chin-hu (Deputy Magistrate of Taitung County), Lin Ming-chen (Magistrate of Nantou County), Fu Kun-chi (Magistrate of Hualien County) and Wu Cherng-dean (Deputy Magistrate of Kinmen County). Their visit was aimed to reset and restart cross-strait relations after President Tsai Ing-wen took office on 20 May 2016. The eight local leaders reiterated their support of One-China policy under the 1992 consensus. They met with Taiwan Affairs Office Head Zhang Zhijun and Chairperson of the Chinese People's Political Consultative Conference Yu Zhengsheng.
