= Beipu =

Rural township in Hsinchu County, Taiwan

Beipu Township 北埔鄉 Hoppo
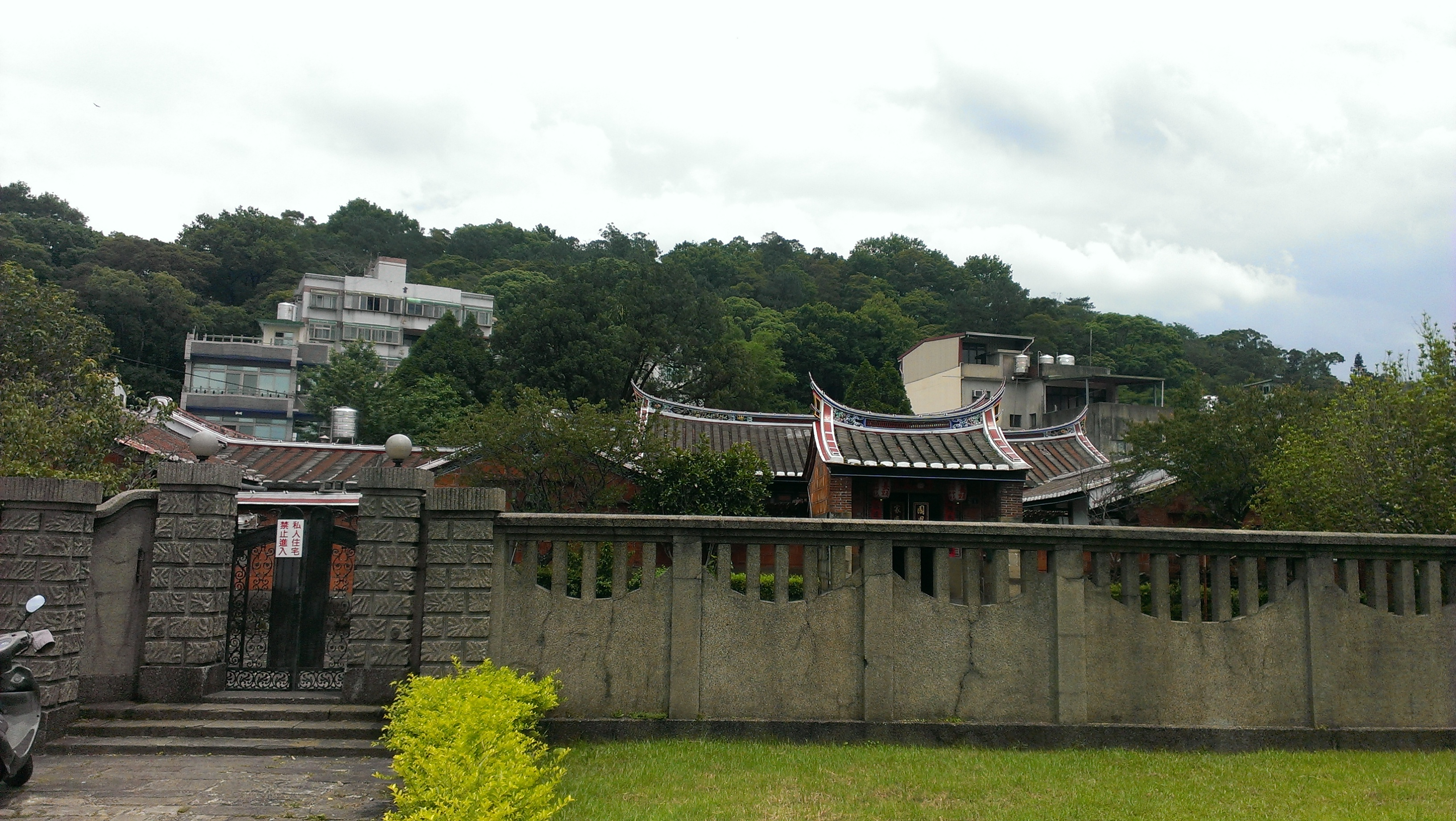

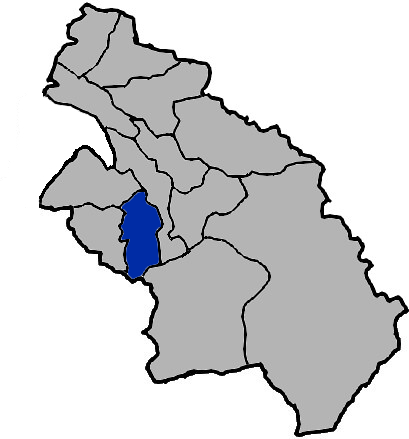
- Beipu Township in Hsinchu County

- Location within Taiwan
- Coordinates: 24°39′50″N 121°4′5″E
- Country: Republic of China
- Province: Taiwan
- County: Hsinchu

Government
  - Type: Rural township

Area
  - Total: 50.6676 km^{2} (19.5629 sq mi)

Population (March 2023)
  - Total: 8,633
  - Density: 170.4/km^{2} (441.3/sq mi)
- Website: www.beipu.gov.tw (in Chinese)

Beipu Township (Chinese: 北埔鄉; pinyin: Běipǔ Xiāng; Hakka: Pet-phû-hiông) is a rural township in Hsinchu County, Taiwan. Beipu is well known in Taiwan as a center of Hakka culture, especially for production of dongfang meiren tea and its special Hakkanese blends of tea and nuts called lei cha.

== History ==
The town was the scene of the 1907 Hoppo Uprising against Japanese rule of Taiwan when insurgents of both Hakka and indigenous Saisiyat extraction attacked Japanese officials and their families. In retaliation, Japanese military and police killed more than 100 Hakka people, the majority of whom were young men from Neidaping (內大坪), a small village in the mountainous southern part of the township.

== Demographics ==
As of March 2023, Beipu had a population of 8,633, of whom 98 percent were Hakka.

== Administrative divisions ==
The township comprises nine villages: Beipu, Nanxing, Dahu, Puwei, Shuiji, Nanpu, Dalin, Nankeng, and Waiping.

== Tourist attractions ==
- Beipu Citian Temple
- Green World Ecological Farm
- Jin Guang Fu Mansion

== Notable natives ==
- Peng Tso-kwei, Minister of Council of Agriculture (1997–1999)
- Perng Shaw-jiin, Deputy Chairperson of Fair Trade Commission
- Huang Kuo-shu, former President of the Legislative Yuan (1961-1972).
