= Hsinchu County Constituency =

Constituency of the Legislative Yuan of Taiwan

- 2 Single-member constituency for the Legislative Yuan
- County(s): Hsinchu County

Current constituency
- Created: 2007
- Members: Chiu Ching-chun (2008–2010); Perng Shaw-jiin (2010–2012); Hsu Hsin-ying (2012–2016); Lin Wei-chou (2016–2020)

Hsinchu County Constituency (Chinese: 新竹縣選舉區; pinyin: Xīnzhú Xiàn Xuǎnjǔ Qū) was a single-member constituency for legislative elections from 2008 to 2016. In 2019, it was split into constituencies I and II.

== Current districts ==
- Hsinchu County Constituency 1 - Western part of Zhubei City and Xinfeng, Hukou, Xinpu, Qionglin, Guanxi, Jianshi Townships
- Hsinchu County Constituency 2 - Eastern part of Zhubei City and Zhudong, Baoshan, Beipu, Emei, Hengshan, Wufeng Townships
Hsinchu County Constituency 1

Hsinchu County Constituency 2

== List of representatives ==
Representative	Party	Dates	Notes
Chiu Ching-chun	Kuomintang	2008–2009	
Perng Shaw-jiin	Democratic Progressive Party	2010–2012	
Hsu Hsin-ying	Kuomintang → Minkuotang	2012–2016	
Lin Wei-chou	Kuomintang	2016–2019	

== Election results ==
Legislative Election 2016: Hsinchu County district
Party	Candidate	Votes	%	±%
KMT	Lin Wei-chou	93,495	36.75	
Independent	Cheng Yung-chin	85,170	33.48	
Minkuotang	Chiu ching-ya	63,512	24.96	
Others	Zhuo Enzong	5,442	2.14	
Independent	Huang Xiulong	2,776	1.09	
Others	Su Wenying	1,603	0.63	
Others	Li Zonghua	1,520	0.60	
Others	Fan Zhenkui	909	0.36	
Majority		8,325	3.35	
Total valid votes		254,427	96.83	
Rejected ballots		8,331	3.17	
Minkuotang gain from KMT		Swing		
Turnout		262,758	66.27	
Registered electors		396,492		

== See also ==
- Hsinchu County electoral constituencies
