= Tsai Hau =

Taiwanese politician (born 1958)

Tsai Hau MLY
- 蔡豪
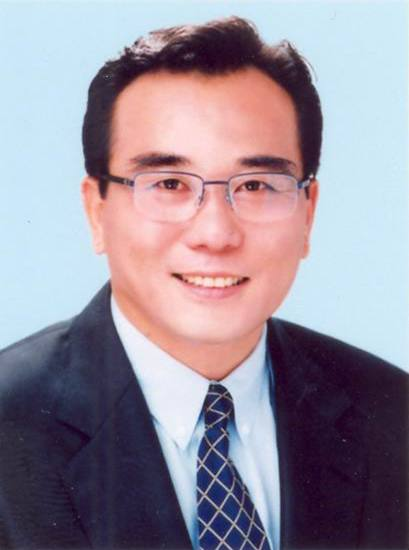
- Tsai Hau in 2005

Vice Chairman of the Congress Party Alliance
- In office 18 October 2018 – January 2019
- Preceded by: Position established
- Succeeded by: Hsu Hsin-ying

Member of the Legislative Yuan
- In office 1 February 1999 – 31 January 2008
- Constituency: Pingtung County

Personal details
- Born: 1 August 1958 (age 67) Pingtung County, Taiwan
- Party: Independent
- Other political affiliations: Non-Partisan Solidarity Union (2004–2008); Kuomintang (2008–?); Congress Party Alliance (2018–2020)
- Spouse: Song Li-hua (div. 2017)
- Education: Republic of China Military Academy (BS); National Sun Yat-sen University (MA)

Tsai Hau (Chinese: 蔡豪; born 1 August 1958) is a Taiwanese politician. He served three terms on the Legislative Yuan from 1999 to 2008. Originally elected as a political independent, Tsai joined the Non-Partisan Solidarity Union in 2004, and represented the Kuomintang in the 2009 Taiwanese local elections. From 2018 to 2019, Tsai was vice chairman of the Congress Party Alliance.

== Career ==
Tsai was involved in the Taiwanese mass media industry, as a shareholder in the New Taipei Mass Communication company, and as shareholder and member of the board of directors in Eastern Multimedia. He also chaired The Commons Daily, and was executive director of the General Chamber of Commerce of the Republic of China.

Tsai was first elected to the Legislative Yuan in 1998, taking office as a political independent representing Pingtung County. In May 2000, Tsai co-initiated a signature drive within the Legislative Yuan in support of the National Coalition Government of the Union of Burma. He was the convener of the National Non-Party League, and helped reform a caucus for independents, known as the Non-partisan Alliance, during his next term in 2002. Tsai was one of ten founding members of the Non-Partisan Solidarity Union, established in June 2004, and served the new political party as its legislative whip. He won reelection to the Legislative Yuan as an NPSU candidate later that year, as did five other incumbent legislators representing the party.

In 2008, The Taiwan Tongzhi Hotline Association advised gay and lesbian voters not to vote for a list of political candidates, including Tsai, that the organization considered to be opponents of LGBT rights. Tsai contested the Pingtung County 1 seat, and lost to Su Chen-ching.

Over the course of his legislative tenure, Tsai has been involved in several incidents of legislative chaos and violence. During the speakership and vice speakership votes in 2002, Democratic Progressive Party lawmaker Chu Hsing-yu climbed unto the speaker's podium to look at Tsai's ballot. During a January 2007 budget vote and consideration of nominations to the Central Election Commission, Tsai joined Kuomintang colleagues rushing to legislative speaker Wang Jin-pyng as Democratic Progressive Party legislators sought to stall the vote by gathering at the speaker's podium. Several of the confrontations took place as Tsai served the Home and Nations legislative committee as a convener. He was gagged by pan-green affiliated legislators as he tried to adjourn a committee meeting on amendments to the Referendum Act in January 2007, and had to dismiss a March 2007 meeting on absentee voting early due to arguments between lawmakers that began before the meeting could be called to order. In a joint meeting of the Home and Nations Committee and the Organic Laws and Statutes Committee in May 2007, Tsai pulled a microphone away from Kao Chien-chih and asked chairwoman Chang Ching-hui to adjourn the meeting. In a May 2007 meeting of the Home and Nations Committee, David Huang discovered that business executives in technology had been invited to attend, and called the invitation an attempt to "ambush" pan-green lawmakers who opposed the bill meant to be discussed during that meeting. After Huang shouted, "The KMT doesn't love Taiwan. It's trying to sell us out to China!", Tsai replied, "I'll be waiting outside the legislature for you later. How about that?"

Tsai sought election to the Pingtung County Council in 2009, and served as founding vice chairman of the Congress Party Alliance in 2018.

== Legal actions ==
In November 1999, Tsai, representing the Taiwan Development and Trust Corporation, helped the company buy property in Yangmei, Taoyuan, owned by the Far Eastern Silo and Shipping Company. The Far Eastern Silo and Shipping executive Gary Wang had bought the land the previous year at an inflated price, embezzled money and sold the land to TDTC at yet another inflated price. The Taiwan High Court ruled in May 2007 that Tsai had perpetrated a breach of trust and sentenced him to one year of imprisonment. Allegations about the acquisition had been outstanding since at least 2000. The pair were formally indicted on charges of fraud in January 2001, alongside eleven others. Prosecutors originally sought a prison term of three years for Tsai. In March 2008, the Apple Daily reported that Tsai was one of thirteen people to have received a sum of money from Wang You-theng, Gary Wang's father. In February 2009, Tsai was called as a witness for a hearing in which the Taipei District Court decided to grant Gary Wang bail.

As the Chu Mei-feng sex scandal broke, Tsai denied that he was recorded having sex with Chu.

Prosecution of Tsai for voter fraud began just before the 2004 legislative elections, after a three year investigation had ended.

Tsai was indicted in March 2008 for violating the National Security Law, the Immigration Law, and Offenses of Concealment of Offenders and Destruction of Evidence in aiding convicted banker Wang Hsuan-jen's move to China. He was sentenced by the Taiwan High Court in June 2010 to six months imprisonment or a fine of NT$180,000.

Tsai's 2009 election to the Pingtung County Council as a Kuomintang candidate was nullified by the Pingtung District Court, due to his conviction on charges of vote buying.

In a case of fraud dating to 2011, the Kaohsiung branch of the Taiwan High Court heard an appeal and convicted Tsai on charges of forgery in January 2021, sentencing him to four years and ten months imprisonment. The appeal has not yet been heard by the Supreme Court.

In 2014, the Supreme Court ruled that Tsai was guilty of vote buying during his 2008 legislative campaign. He was sentenced to four years imprisonment and had his civil rights suspended for four years. Tsai was released on parole in September 2015.

In 2016, a woman accused Tsai of sexually assaulting her twice, while she worked at his consultancy firm. An appeal of the case was heard by the Supreme Court in June 2021. The Supreme Court upheld the conviction and the prison sentence of four years and ten months.

== Personal life ==
Tsai Hau's wife Song Li-hua has served on the Pingtung County Council. The pair's election to the county council in 2009 marked the first time a married couple had served together on that legislative body. Tsai and Song divorced in 2017.
