= Xinfeng, Hsinchu =

Rural township in Hsinchu County, Taiwan

Xinfeng Township 新豐鄉 Sinfong, Hsinfeng
- Rural township
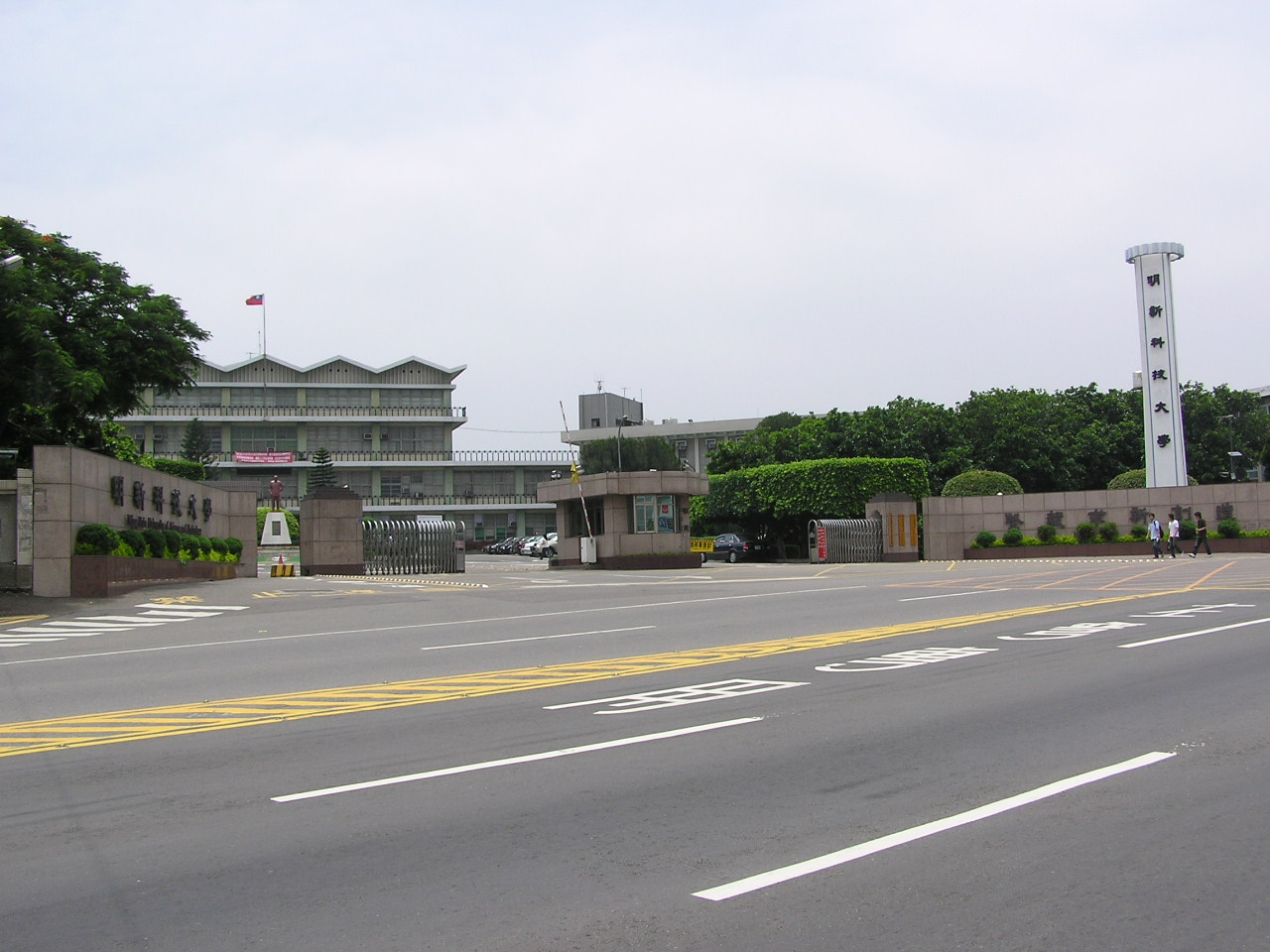

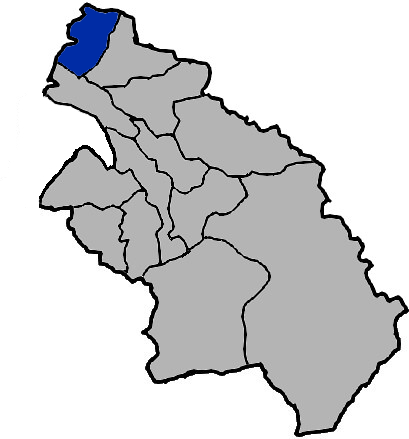
- Xinfeng Township in Hsinchu County

- Location within Taiwan
- Coordinates: 24°55′N 121°0′E
- Location: Hsinchu County, Taiwan

Area
  - Total: 46 km^{2} (18 sq mi)

Population (February 2023)
  - Total: 58,614
  - Density: 1,300/km^{2} (3,300/sq mi)
- Website: www.hchfe.gov.tw (in Chinese)

Xinfeng Township (Chinese: 新豐鄉; pinyin: Xīnfēng Xiāng) is a rural township in Hsinchu County in northern Taiwan. It had an estimated population of 58,614 as of February 2023.

== History ==
Xinfeng is a major industrial and manufacturing center in Hsinchu. It shares the Hsinchu Industrial Park with its neighboring town, Hukou. It is also the home of Ming Hsin University.

== Geography ==
Xinfeng, encompassing 46.35 km^{2} (17.90 sq mi), is bounded by the Taiwan Strait on its west, Zhubei City to the south, Hukou Township to the east and Xinwu District of Taoyuan City on the north.

== Administrative divisions ==
The township comprises 17 villages: Fengkeng, Fuxing, Houhu, Jingpu, Potou, Puhe, Qiding, Ruixing, Shangkeng, Shanqi, Songbo, Songlin, Xhongxing, Xinfeng, Yuanshan, Zhonglun and Zhongxiao.

== Education ==
- Minghsin University of Science and Technology

== Tourist attractions ==
- Little Ding-Dong Science Theme Park

== Transportation ==
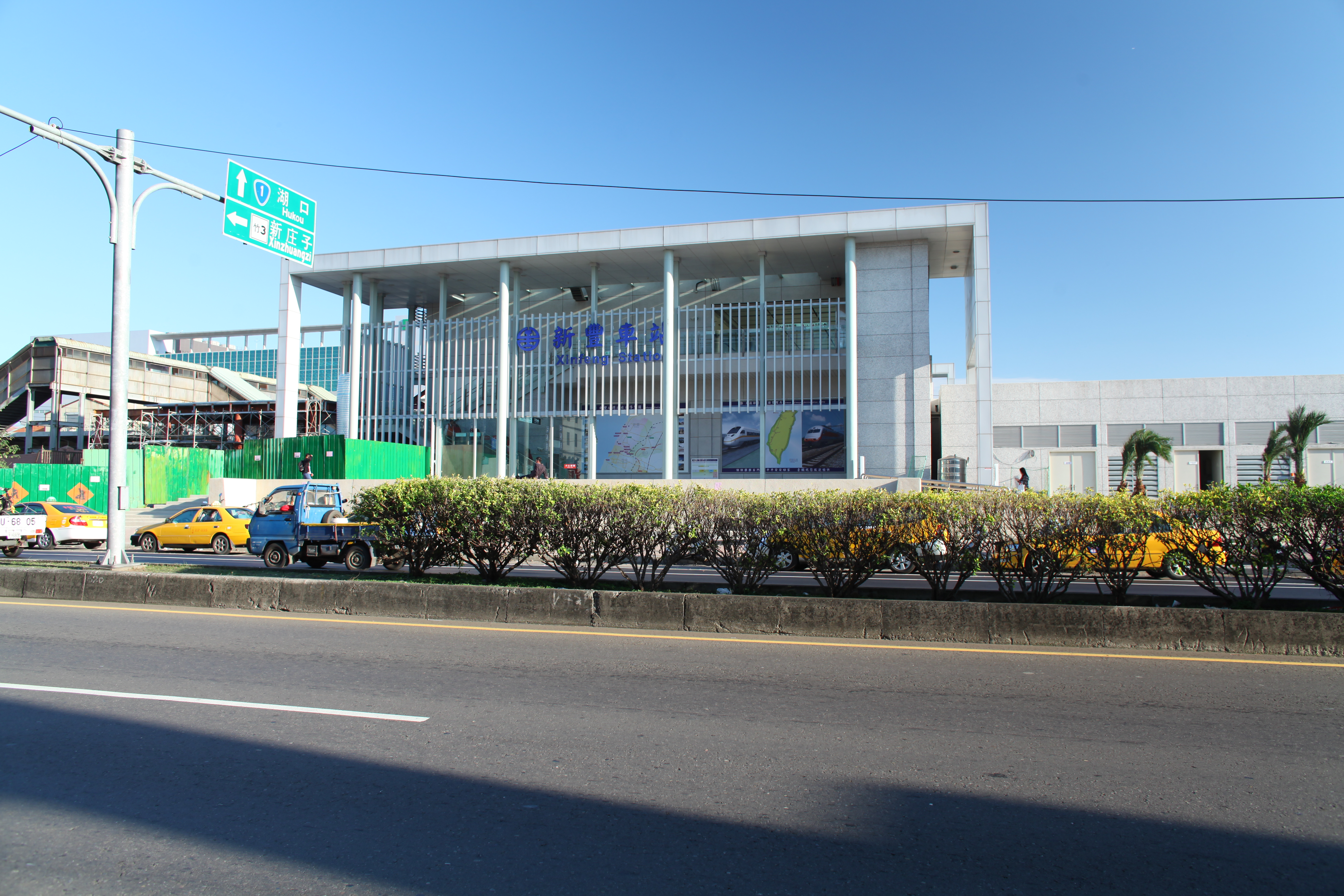
Xinfeng Station

	name	other
Railway	West Main-line	Xinfeng Station
Highway	Tai1	
Highway	Tai15	

== Notable natives ==
- Hsu Hsin-ying, Chairperson of Minkuotang
- Hebe Tien. singer
