= 富岡 =

富岡, meaning "rich hill", may refer to:

- Fugang (disambiguation), the Chinese transliteration
- Tomioka (disambiguation), the Japanese transliteration
