= Hsu Hsin-ying =

Taiwanese politician (born 1972)

- 徐欣瑩
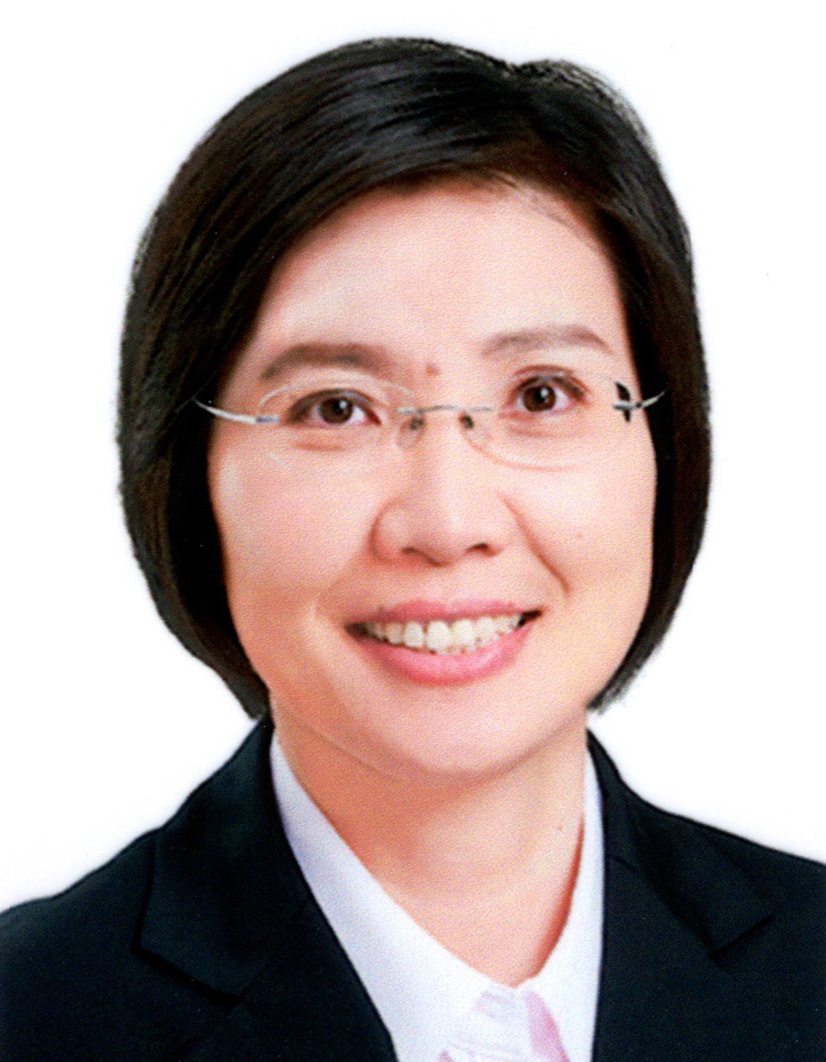
- Official portrait, 2024

Member of the Legislative Yuan
- Incumbent
- Assumed office 1 February 2024
- Preceded by: Lin Wei-chou
- Constituency: Hsinchu County 1
- In office 1 February 2012 – 31 January 2016
- Preceded by: Perng Shaw-jiin
- Succeeded by: Lin Wei-chou
Party offices
Chairperson of the Minkuotang
In office 13 March 2015 – 29 November 2018
Preceded by	Position established
Succeeded by	Wu Hsu-chih
Vice Chairperson of the Congress Party Alliance
In office 10 June 2019 – 31 March 2020
Preceded by	Tsai Hau
Succeeded by	Position abolished

Personal details
- Born: 23 April 1972 (age 54) Xinfeng, Hsinchu County, Taiwan
- Party: Kuomintang (2009–2015; after 2022); Congress Party Alliance (2019–2020); Minkuotang (2015–2019); Independent (before 2009)
- Education: National Cheng Kung University (BS); National Chiao Tung University (MS, PhD)
- Scientific career
- Fields: Geodesy
- Thesis: Improved Determinations of Global Gravity Anomaly Model and Shallow-Water Gravity Anomalies from Multi-Satellite Altimetry (2007)

Hsu Hsin-ying (Chinese: 徐欣瑩; pinyin: Xú Xīnyíng; born 23 April 1972) is a Taiwanese politician and geodesist. Prior to joining the Kuomintang (KMT) in 2009, Hsu was an independent. She left the KMT to found the Minkuotang (MKT) in 2015. In 2019, the MKT was absorbed by the Congress Party Alliance. Hsu rejoined the Kuomintang in 2022, and was reelected in the 2024 legislative election.

== Early life and education ==
Hsu was born on 23 April 1972 in Xinfeng Township, Hsinchu County, Taiwan. She is of Hakka Chinese descent. Her father, Hsu Ching-lan, graduated from National Taiwan Normal University and served as the township chief of Xinfeng and as a secretary in the Hsinchu County Government. Her mother, Chien Pai-ho, graduated from National Chengchi University and became a teacher.

Hsu attended Shanqi Elementary School and Xinfeng Junior High School. She then finished high school at Taipei Municipal Zhongshan Girls High School. After high school, she graduated with a bachelor's degree in surveying engineering from National Cheng Kung University. As an undergraduate, she focused on satellite geodesy. She then pursued her doctoral studies at National Chiao Tung University, where she researched satellite altimetry data. As a doctoral student, Hsu had the opportunity to pursue further study at NASA, but chose to complete her degree in Taiwan after her mother became ill.

Hsu earned her master's degree in 1997 and her Ph.D. in civil engineering from National Chiao Tung University in 2007. Her doctoral dissertation was titled, Improved Determinations of Global Gravity Anomaly Model and Shallow-Water Gravity Anomalies from Multi-Satellite Altimetry (利用多衛星測高資料改善全球重力異常模型以及淺海區重力異常). She was the first Taiwanese woman to earn a doctorate with a focus on satellite surveying.

== Engineering career ==
Hsu is a specialist in satellite geodesy. Her master's and doctoral research used satellite altimetry to process global sea surface data and produce global geoid and gravity anomaly models. While pursuing her doctoral research, she charted the depths of the Mariana Trench and the Taiwan Strait.

Hsu was a co-author of a 2002 paper in the Journal of Geodesy that computed global mean sea surface height and marine gravity anomaly grids from multi-satellite altimetry data. She was also a co-author of a 2006 Journal of Geodesy paper on coastal gravity anomalies derived from retracked Geosat altimetry data. In 2008, she co-authored a study in the Journal of the Chinese Institute of Engineers on shallow-water gravity anomalies derived from satellite altimetry, with case studies in the East China Sea and the Taiwan Strait. Both NASA and the Danish Space Research Institute wrote to Hsu and offered funding to invite her to take part in their research.

Hsu has worked as a lecturer at Minghsin University of Science and Technology and as a researcher at the Satellite Survey Center of the Ministry of the Interior's Department of Land Administration. She is a qualified professional surveyor and passed the senior professional and technical examination in the engineer category.

== Political career ==
=== Political beginnings ===
Hsu first ran for office in 2005, for a position on the Hsinchu County Council, for which she was defeated. She organized a bid for the Legislative Yuan in 2008, resulting in the same outcome. After joining the Kuomintang in 2009, she won and served on the county council, before winning a Legislative Yuan seat in the 2012 elections as a member of the Kuomintang. In that election, Hsu won 171,466 votes, the most of any one candidate that year. Hsu was reelected to the KMT's Central Standing Committee in August 2014, but did not serve a full one-year term. Instead, she split from the party in January 2015, and founded the Minkuotang (MKT) in March, serving as the MKT's first chair.

=== 2016 campaigns ===
Hsu ran for reelection in Hsinchu County until People First Party chairman James Soong named her the vice presidential candidate for his 2016 presidential campaign in November 2015. The PFP–MKT coalition finished third in the presidential election and the MKT lost its only seat in the Legislative Yuan.

=== Later political career ===
Hsu contested the Hsinchu County magistracy in 2018. She finished second of four candidates, with 32.29% of the vote.

Following her loss to Yang Wen-ke, Hsu resigned the Minkuotang leadership on 29 November 2018, and the party merged into the Congress Party Alliance on 25 January 2019.

Hsu rejoined the Kuomintang in May 2022, and began her Hsinchu County legislative campaign in March 2023. She was reelected in the January 2024 legislative election. In the 2026 local election, Hsu Hsin-ying won the primary for the Hsinchu County magistracy against deputy county magistrate Chen Chien-hsien. During her magisterial campaign, Hsu went on a hunger strike to protest a search of her office.

== Personal life ==
Hsu has a younger brother, Hsu Shih-hsun, who studied molecular science in college. By 2014, he had accompanied his sister through each of her election campaigns. That year, he ran for the Taipei City Council as an independent candidate in the Songshan–Xinyi district.

Hsu is a disciple of the Chan Buddhist leader Wujue Miaotian (悟覺妙天). She began learning meditation from him at the age of 25, while she was a master's student at National Chiao Tung University. She has said that her teacher is often misunderstood to be associated with the Buddhist cult Miaochan, which he is not.

Party political offices
New political party	Chairperson of the Minkuotang; 2015–2018	Succeeded by Wu Hsu-chih; Acting
