= Kuo Yuan Ye =

Taiwanese pastry store chain

Kuo Yuan Ye Foods Co., Ltd.
- 郭元益食品股份有限公司
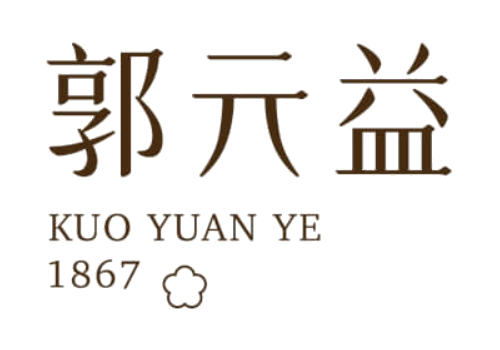

General information
- Location: No.546, Wenlin Rd., Shilin District, Taipei, Taiwan
- Opening: 1867

Website
- www.kuos.com

Kuo Yuan Ye (Chinese: 郭元益食品; pinyin: Guōyuányì) is a chain of pastry stores in Taiwan. Kuo Yuan Ye pastry is prepared with skills passed down through generations.

== History ==
In 1708, ancestors of the Kuo family left their native home in Fujian, China, across the Taiwan Strait, and arrived in what is now known as Taipei. In 1867, Kuo Liang-chen built a squat mudbrick shop in Shilin, Taipei, where he started a pastry business. In memory of his hometown ancestral hall, he gave his store the same name, “Yuan Ye”. From a small shop with no signboard, Kuo Yuan Ye has grown to become renowned for its dedication to preserving the traditional Taiwanese culture and offering aesthetic pastries. Many well known favorites are the wedding gift box, bride cake, pineapple cake, moon cake, and various Taiwanese pastries.

In order to preserve the rich historical asset of Taiwanese pastry, Kuo Yuan Ye established the first museum of cake and pastry in 2001. Kuo Yuan Ye Museum of Cake and Pastry displays the art and development of Taiwanese pastry and cake, as well as the history and customs of pastry in weddings, festival ceremony and other life events. The museum also allows guests to experience making Taiwanese cakes and pastries. The museum has two branches in Taiwan, one in Shilin District, Taipei and another in Yangmei District, Taoyuan City.

== Transportation ==
The store is accessible within walking distance north from Shilin Station of the Taipei Metro.
