= Fugang =

Fugang may refer to:

- Fugang Fishery Harbor, a harbor in Taitung City, Taitung County, Taiwan
- Fugang railway station, a railway station on the Taiwan Railways Administration West Coast line
- Fugang Residential Community (富冈社区), Chaolian Subdistrict, Pengjiang District, Jiangmen, Guangdong, China
- Fugang Township (富岗乡), Yi County, Hebei Province, China
- Fugang Village (付岗村), Chengbei Subdistrict, Yingcheng, Xiaogan, Hubei Province, China
- Fugang Village (富岡里), Taitung City, Taitung, Taiwan
- Fugang Village (富岡里), Yangmei District, Taoyuan, Taiwan
- Cheng Fugang (程福剛; 1900–1986), member of the first Legislative Yuan
- Yang Fugang (杨福刚), member of the 11th National People's Congress
