= Kuo Yuan Ye Museum of Cake and Pastry =

Museum in Taipei City and Taoyuan City of Taiwan

- 郭元益糕餅博物館
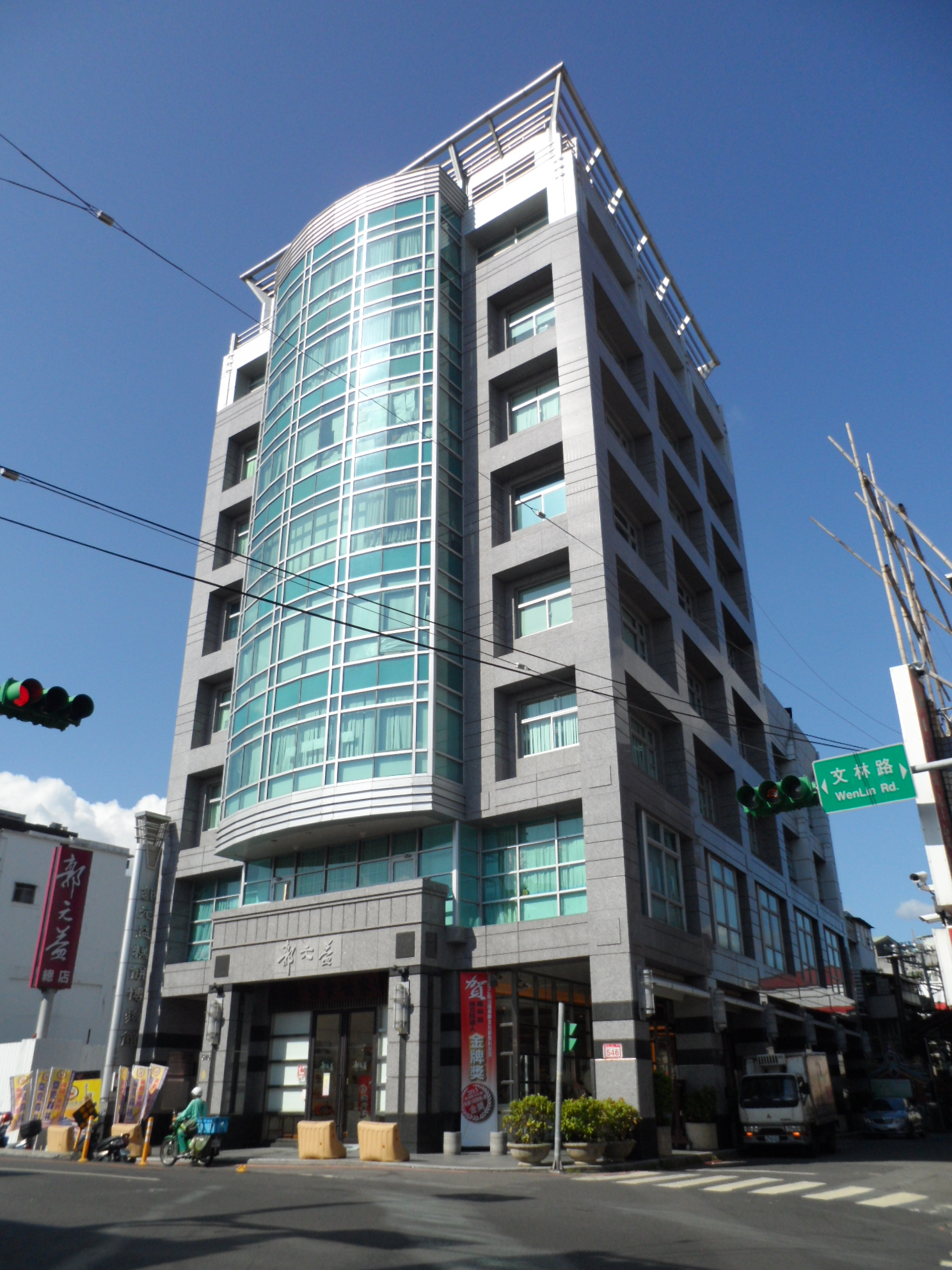
- Established: 2001
- Location: Shilin, Taipei; Yangmei, Taoyuan City, Taiwan
- Type: museum
- Website: Official website (in Chinese)

The Kuo Yuan Ye Museum of Cake and Pastry (simplified Chinese: 郭元益糕饼博物馆; traditional Chinese: 郭元益糕餅博物館; pinyin: Guōyuányì Gāobǐng Bówùguǎn) is a pastry culture and making museum in Taiwan.

The museum has two branches in Taiwan, one in Shilin District, Taipei, and another in Yangmei District, Taoyuan City.

== History ==
In 1708, an ancestor of Kuo Yuan Ye moved from Zhangzhou to Taiwan within the Fujian Province during the Qing Dynasty and started the family bakery business. To preserve the brand asset, the family opened a bakery museum at the 4th and 5th floor of the headquarters buildings in Yangmei District as Taiwan's first bakery museum in 2001. In 2002, the Shilin branch of the bakery museum was founded.

== Transportation ==
The museum is accessible within walking distance north from Shilin Station of the Taipei Metro for the Shilin branch, and northwest from Puxin Station of the Taiwan Railway for the Yangmei branch.

== See also ==
- List of museums in Taiwan
