= Arwin Charisma Museum =

Museum in Yangmei, Taoyuan City, Taiwan

- 雅聞魅力博覽館
- Established: 2006
- Location: Yangmei, Taoyuan City, Taiwan
- Coordinates: 24°54′26″N 121°08′59″E
- Type: museum
- Public transit access: Yangmei Station
- Website: Official website (in Chinese)

The Arwin Charisma Museum (traditional Chinese: 雅聞魅力博覽館; simplified Chinese: 雅闻魅力博览馆; pinyin: Yǎwén Mèilì Bólǎnguǎn) is a museum in Yangmei District, Taoyuan City, Taiwan.

== Architecture ==
The museum combines the industries of cosmetics, healthcare, foods, underwear and spa, which was created using Bali elements of thatched buildings and stone sculptures, relaxing music and mist that gives the fragrance of essential oils permeate the air. The museum has a total floor area of nearly 1 hectare.

== Transportation ==
The museum is accessible within walking distance south from Yangmei Station of Taiwan Railway.

== See also ==
- List of museums in Taiwan
