= Little Ding-Dong Science Theme Park =

Theme park in Xinfeng, Hsinchu County, Taiwan

Little Ding-Dong Science Theme Park 小叮噹科學主題樂園
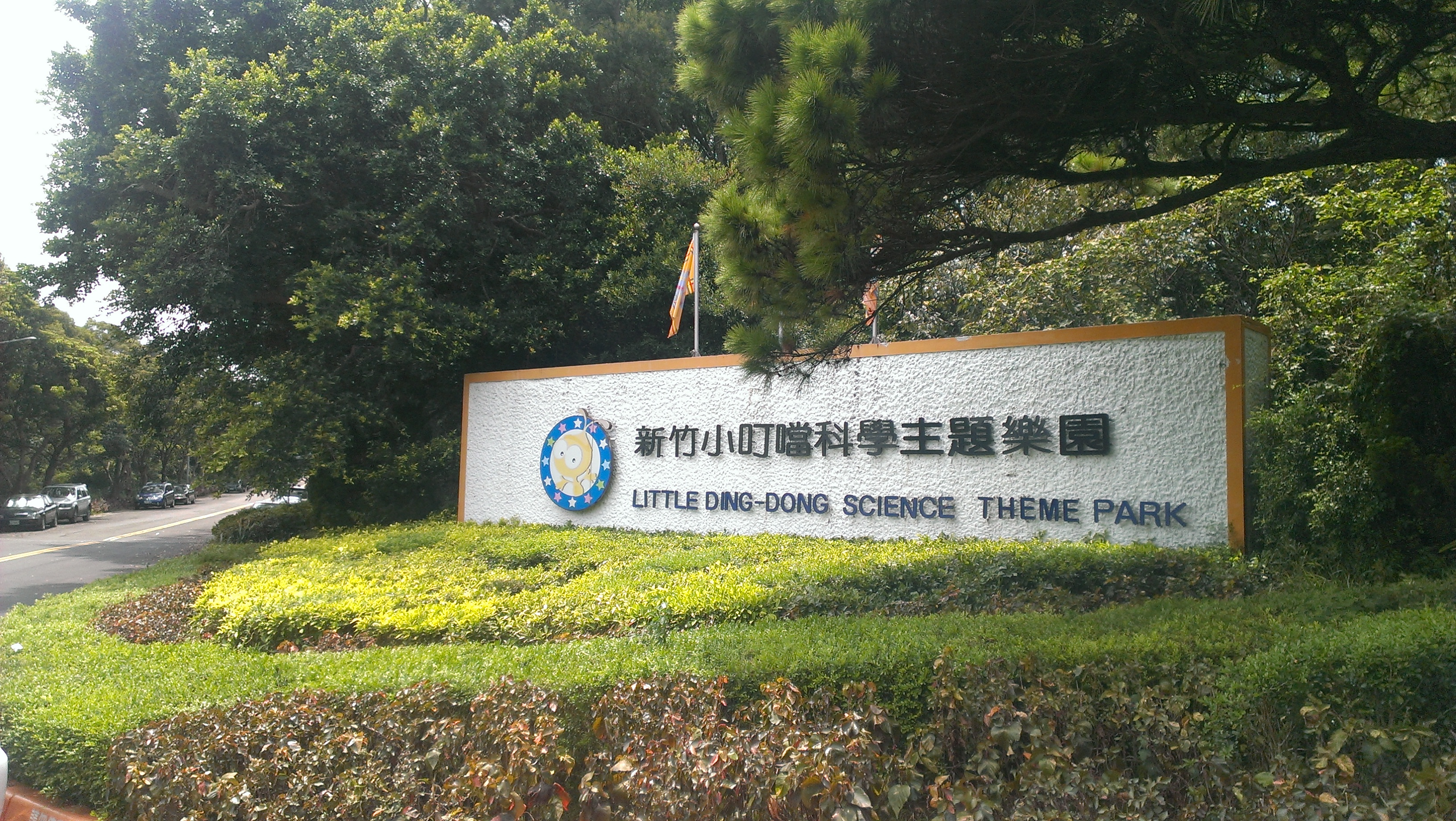
- Interactive map of Little Ding-Dong Science Theme Park 小叮噹科學主題樂園
- Location: Xinfeng, Hsinchu County, Taiwan
- Coordinates: 24°52′09″N 120°58′47″E
- Status: Operating
- Opened: 1979
- Area: 30 ha (74 acres)

Attractions
- Total: 30
- Website: Official website

The Little Ding-Dong Science Theme Park (Chinese: 小叮噹科學主題樂園; Tongyong Pinyin: Siǎodīngdāng Kēsyué Jhǔtí Lèyuán) is a theme park in Xinfeng Township, Hsinchu County, Taiwan.

== History ==
The theme park was opened in 1979.

== Architecture ==
The theme park spans over an area of 30 hectares. The park is divided into eight main sections with more than 30 fun activities, with some revolve around water.

== Transportation ==
The park is accessible within walking distance west from Xinfeng Station of Taiwan Railway.

== See also ==
- List of tourist attractions in Taiwan
- List of science centers#Asia
