= China University of Technology =

University in Taipei and Hsinchu County, Taiwan

- 中國科技大學
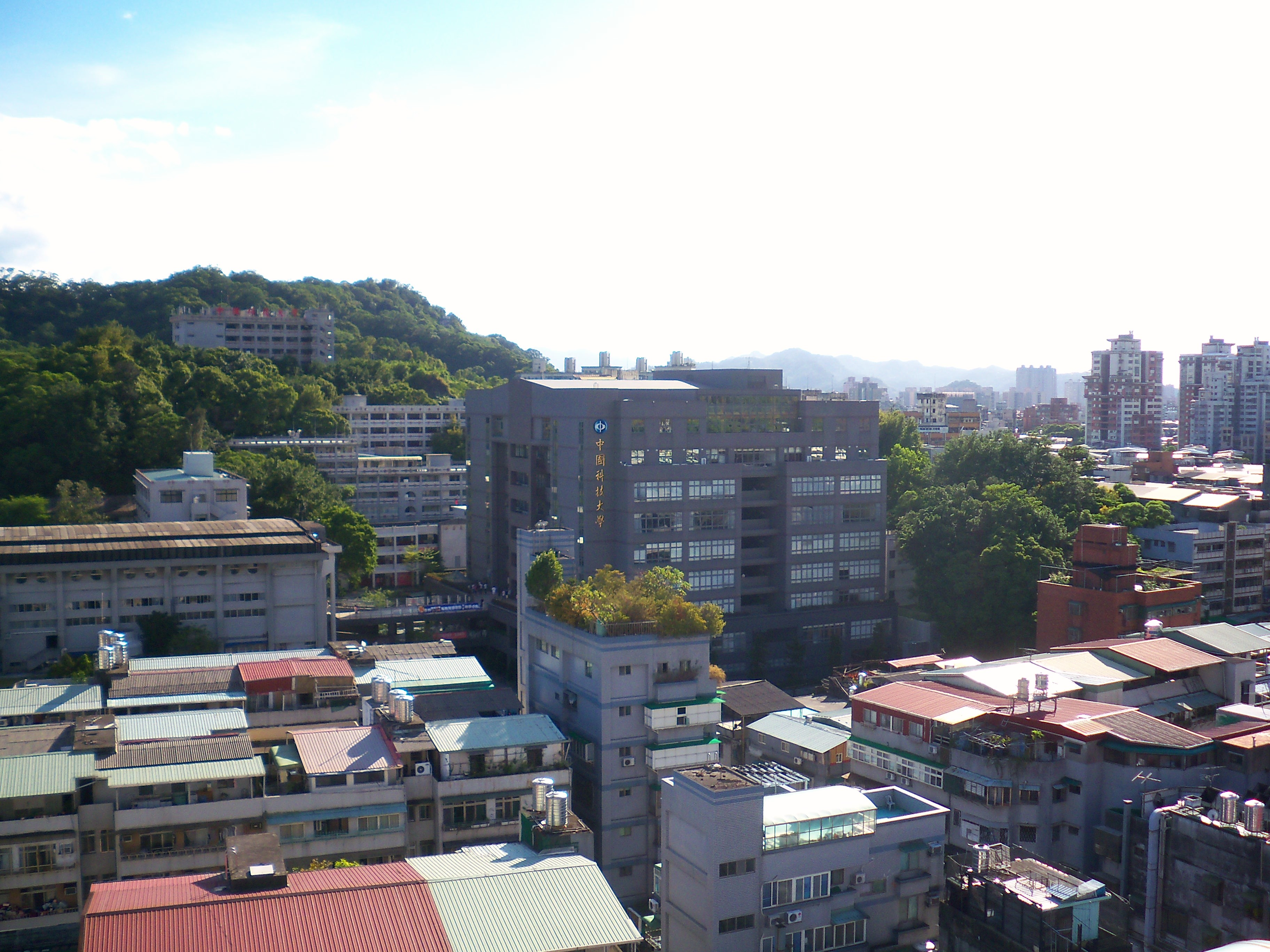
- Former names: Chinese Municipal Vocational School; China Junior College of Industrial and Commercial Management; Chung Kuo Institute of Technology
- Type: Private university
- Established: 1965
- Chairperson: Su Shang-kuan
- President: Yu Min-teh
- Vice-president: Chang Wei-ping, Liao Hsien-wen
- Location: Wenshan, Taipei; Hukou, Hsinchu County; 24.9987°N 121.5551°E
- Campus: Multiple sites
- Website: cute.edu.tw

Chinese name
- Simplified Chinese: 中国科技大学
- Traditional Chinese: 中國科技大學
Transcriptions
Standard Mandarin
- Hanyu Pinyin: Zhōngguó Kējì Dàxué
Southern Min
- Hokkien POJ: Tiong-kok Kho-ki Tāi-ha̍k

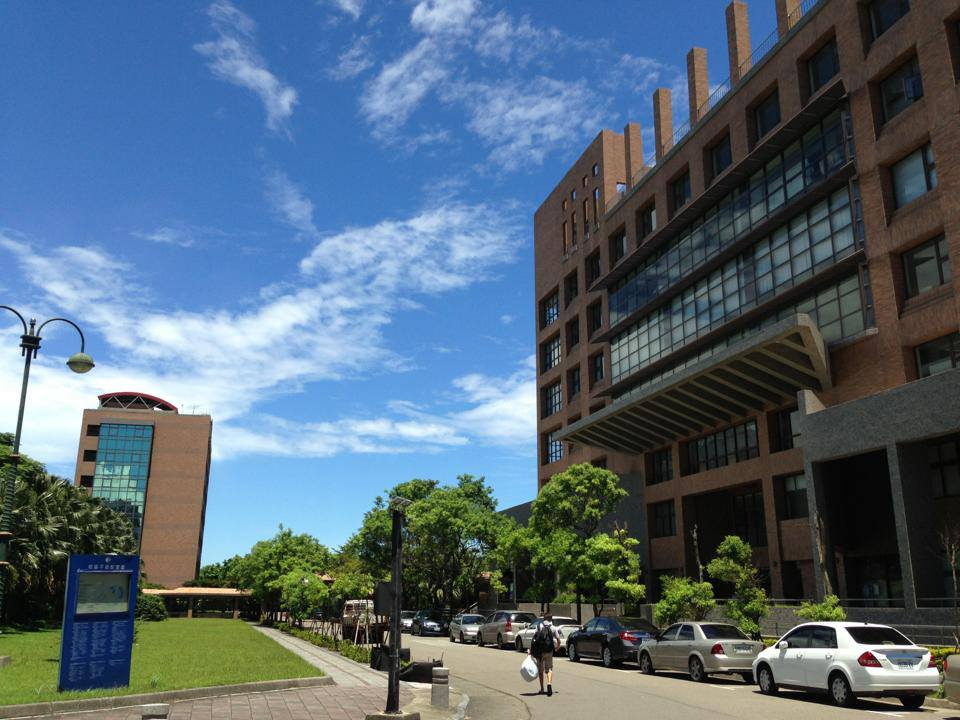
Hsinchu Campus of CUTe

China University of Technology (CUTe; Chinese: 中國科技大學; pinyin: Zhōngguó Kējì Dàxué) is a private university in Taipei, Taiwan. The original campus is situated in Taipei's Wenshan District on five hectares of land. Since 2000, it has operated a second campus on 14 hectares of land in the Hukou township of Hsinchu County, Taiwan.

== History ==
CUTe was founded in 1965 as Chinese Municipal Vocational School. In 1983, the school was renamed to China Junior College of Industrial and Commercial Management. In 2000, the school was renamed again as Chung Kuo Institute of Technology. Finally, in 2005 the school was elevated to university status and on 1 August of the same year, it was renamed China University of Technology.

== Faculties ==
- College of Business
- College of Computer Science
- College of Management
- College of Planning and Design

== Campuses ==
The university is divided into two campuses, which are Taipei Campus and Hsinchu Campus. The Taipei Campus spans over an area of 5 hectares and Hsinchu Campus spans over 14 hectares.

== Transportation ==
The Taipei campus of the university is accessible within walking distance West from Wanfang Hospital Station of the Taipei Metro. The Hsinchu campus of the university is accessible within walking distance South from Beihu Station of Taiwan Railway.

== See also ==
- List of universities in Taiwan
