= Hukou railway station =

Railway station in Hsinchu, Taiwan

Hukou 湖口
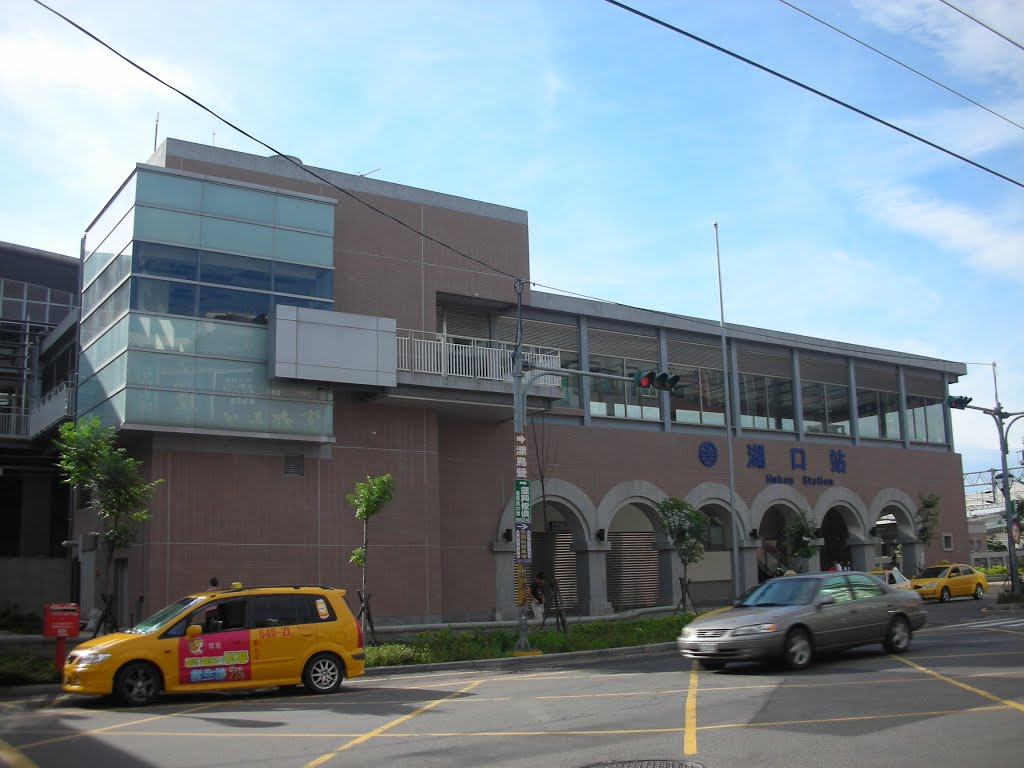

General information
- Location: No.121, Section 2, Zhongshan Rd., Hukou, Hsinchu County, Taiwan
- Coordinates: 24°54′10.4″N 121°02′38.7″E
- Operated by: Taiwan Railway Corporation
- Line: Western Trunk line (112)
- Distance: 89.6 km from Keelung
- Platforms: 2 island platforms

Construction
- Structure type: Elevated

Other information
- Station code: 112
- Classification: 三等站 (Taiwan Railways Administration level)

History
- Opened: 30 October 1893
- Rebuilt: 18 December 2012

Passengers
- 7,296 daily (2024)

Services
Preceding station	Taiwan Railway	Following station
Beihu towards Keelung	Western Trunk line	Xinfeng towards Kaohsiung
Location

Hukou (Chinese: 湖口車站; pinyin: Húkǒu Chēzhàn) is a railway station on Taiwan Railway West Coast line located in Hukou Township, Hsinchu County, Taiwan.

== History ==
The station was opened on 30 October 1893 as Dahukou (大湖口驛). It was renamed to its current name on 1 October 1920. A new, elevated station and platforms were completed on 18 December 2012.

== See also ==
- List of railway stations in Taiwan
