= Puxin railway station =

Railway station in Taoyuan, Taiwan

Coordinates: 25.004203°N 121.444693°E

Puxin 埔心
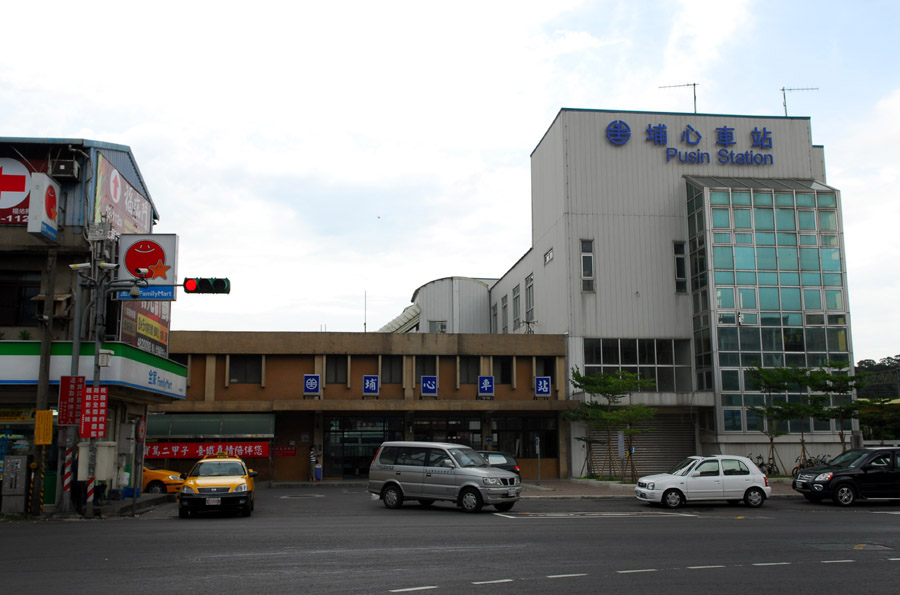

General information
- Location: 208-1 Yongmei Rd. Yangmei, Taoyuan; Taiwan
- Operated by: Taiwan Railway Corporation
- Line: Western Trunk line (109)
- Distance: 73.1 km (45.4 mi) from Keelung
- Platforms: 2 island platforms

Construction
- Structure type: Elevated

History
- Opened: 10 April 1900

Passengers
- 11,957 daily (2024)

Services
Preceding station	Taiwan Railway	Following station
Zhongli towards Keelung	Western Trunk line	Yangmei towards Kaohsiung
Location

Puxin station (traditional Chinese: 埔心車站; simplified Chinese: 埔心车站; pinyin: Bùxīn Chēzhàn) is a railway station on Taiwan Railway West Coast line located in Yangmei District, Taoyuan City, Taiwan.

== History ==
The station was opened in 1900 as Anpinzhen (Hetin) station (安平鎮招呼站). It changed its name to the current name on 1 March 1955.

The station building on the south entrance was built on 31 January 1986, and an expansion on the north entrance was completed on 9 December 2002.

It is only served by local trains.

The station building caught fire on 5 May 2016, and the fire damage was repaired by August 2016.

== Around the station ==
- Kuo Yuan Ye Museum of Cake and Pastry (2,500 meters; 8,200 ft northwest of the station)
- Puxin Night Market (next to the station)
- Puxin Ranch (1,300 meters; 4,300 ft northwest of the station)

== See also ==
- List of railway stations in Taiwan
