= Minghsin University of Science and Technology =

Private university in Taiwan

- 明新科技大學
- Other name: MUST
- Motto: 堅毅、求新、創造
- Motto in English: Insistence, Innovation, Creation
- Type: Private
- Established: March 1966 (as Ming Hsin Engineering College)
- President: Qi-Rui Lin(林啟瑞)
- Administrative staff: 581 (full time)
- Students: 13,467 undergrad., 103 post-grad.
- Location: Xinfeng Township, Hsinchu County, Taiwan; 24°51′46″N 120°59′21″E
- Campus: Semi-rural, 32 acres (320,000 m²)
- Website: fg.must.edu.tw

Minghsin University of Science and Technology
- Traditional Chinese: 明新科技大學
Transcriptions
Standard Mandarin
- Hanyu Pinyin: Míngxīn Kējì Dàxüé
Southern Min
- Hokkien POJ: Bêng-sin Kho-ki Tāi-ha̍k

Minghsin University of Science and Technology (MUST; Chinese: 明新科技大學; Pe̍h-ōe-jī: Bêng-sin Kho-ki Tāi-ha̍k) is a private university in Xinfeng Township, Hsinchu County, Taiwan.

== History ==
I. Industrial Junior College Period

MUST was founded in 1966 that was known as Ming Hsin Engineering College (MEC). During this period, there were only some industrial associate degree programs, like Mechanical Engineering, Civil Engineering, Industrial Management, Chemical Engineering, etc..

II. Industrial and Commercial Junior College Period

MEC was renamed to Ming Hsin Institute of Technology and Commerce (MHITC) in 1993. During this period, commercial programs were added, like International Trade, Business Administration, etc..

III. College Period

In 1997, the Ministry of Education agreed MHITC to upgrade to Ming Hsin Institute of Technology (MHIT) with bachelor's degree programs and associate degree programs. During this period, some programs for service industries were added, like Hotel Management, Child Development and Education, etc..

IV. University Period

The Ministry of Education agreed MHIT to upgrade to a full university called Ming Hsin University of Science and Technology on 1 September 2002, and established three colleges: College of Engineering, Management, and Service Industries. In the same year, master's degree programs were added.

== Campus ==
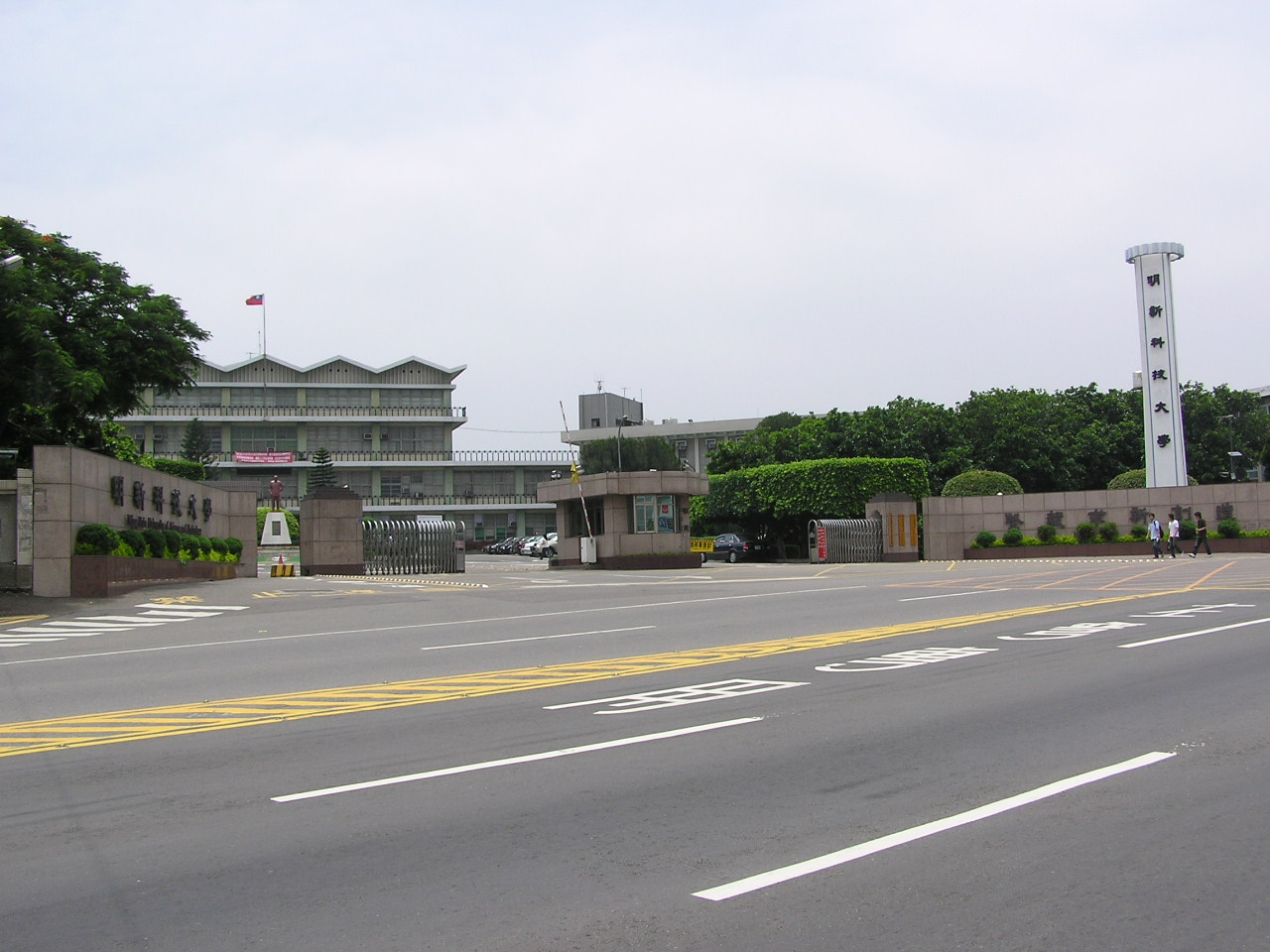
Front Entrance

The campus is situated in Hsinchu County covering a complex of 32 acres (320,000 m²) overlooking Hsinchu City. It is close to both Hsinchu Industrial Park and the renowned Hsinchu Science-based Industrial Park.

== Organization ==
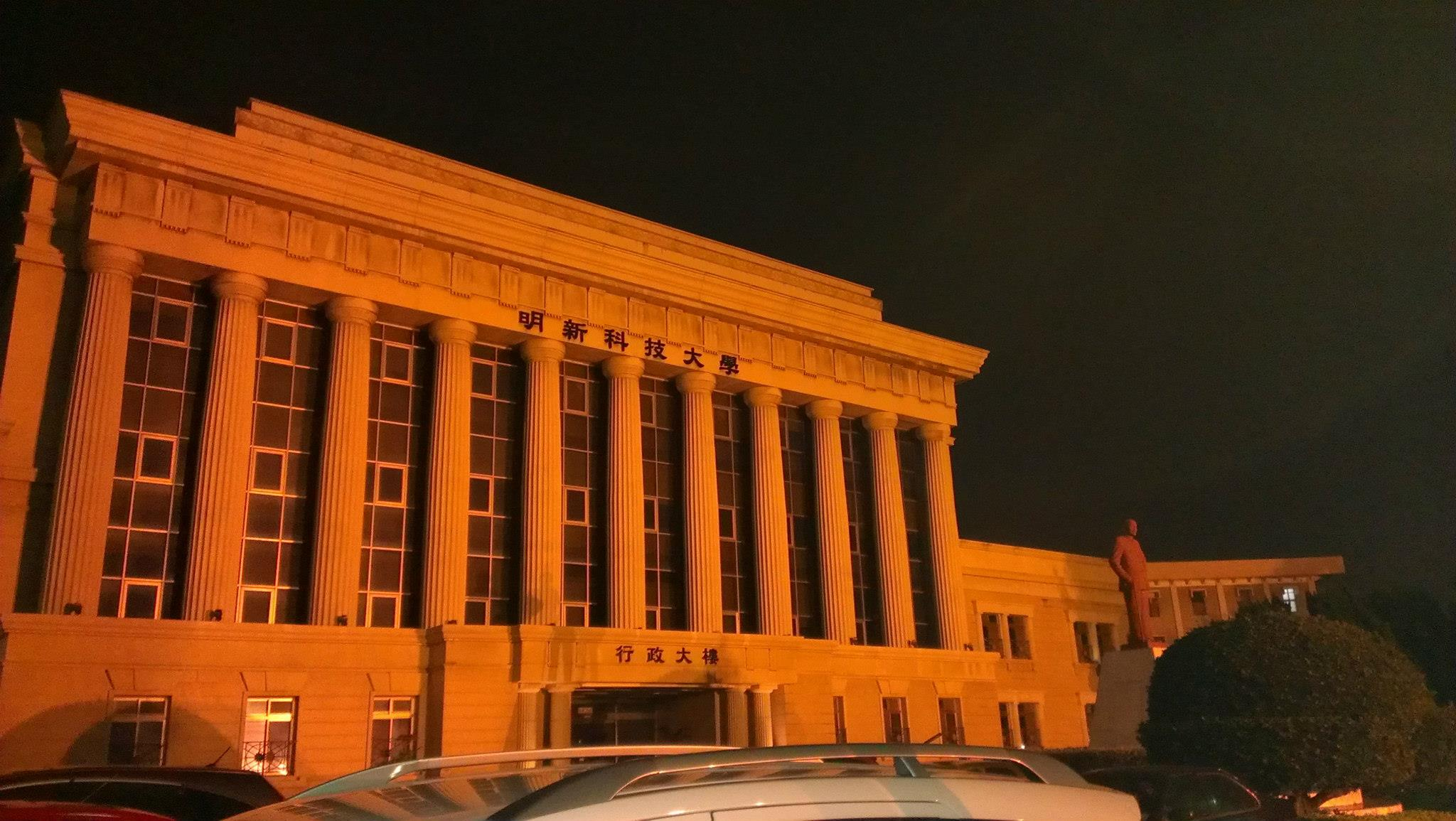
Administration Building

A president heads the university, and it is divided into six colleges, each having a variety of departments:

- College of Semiconductor
  - Department and Institute of Electrical Engineering
  - Department and Institute of Electronic Engineering
  - Department and Institute of Applied Materials Science and Technology
  - Department and Institute of Semiconductor and Electro-Optical Technology
  - Ph.D Program in Semiconductor Technology
- College of Engineering
  - Department of Mechanical Engineering
  - Department and Institute of Civil Engineering and Environmental Informatics
  - Department of Computer Science and Information Engineering
  - Bachelor Program of Wind Power
  - Institute of Precision Mechatronic Engineering
- College of Management
  - Department and Institute of Industrial Engineering and Management
  - Department and Institute of Information Management
  - Department of Marketing and Logistics Management
  - Department and Institute of Business Administration
  - Department of Finance
- College of Human Ecology
  - Department of Hotel Management and Culinary Creativity
  - Department and Institute of Early Childhood Education and Care
  - Department of Leisure Management
  - Department and Institute of Senior Service Industry Management
  - Center for Teacher Education
- College of Humanities and Design
  - Department of International Business and Foreign Languages
  - Department of Sports Management
  - Department Of Multimedia and Game Development
  - Department of Fashion Styling and Design
  - Undergraduate Program of Applied Cosmetics
- College of General Education
  - Center for Liberal Education
  - Center For Bilingual Education

== Notable alumni ==
- Chiu Ching-chun, Magistrate of Hsinchu County (2009–2018)

== See also ==
- List of universities in Taiwan
