= Xinfeng railway station =

Railway station in Hsinchu, Taiwan

Xinfeng Station 新豐車站
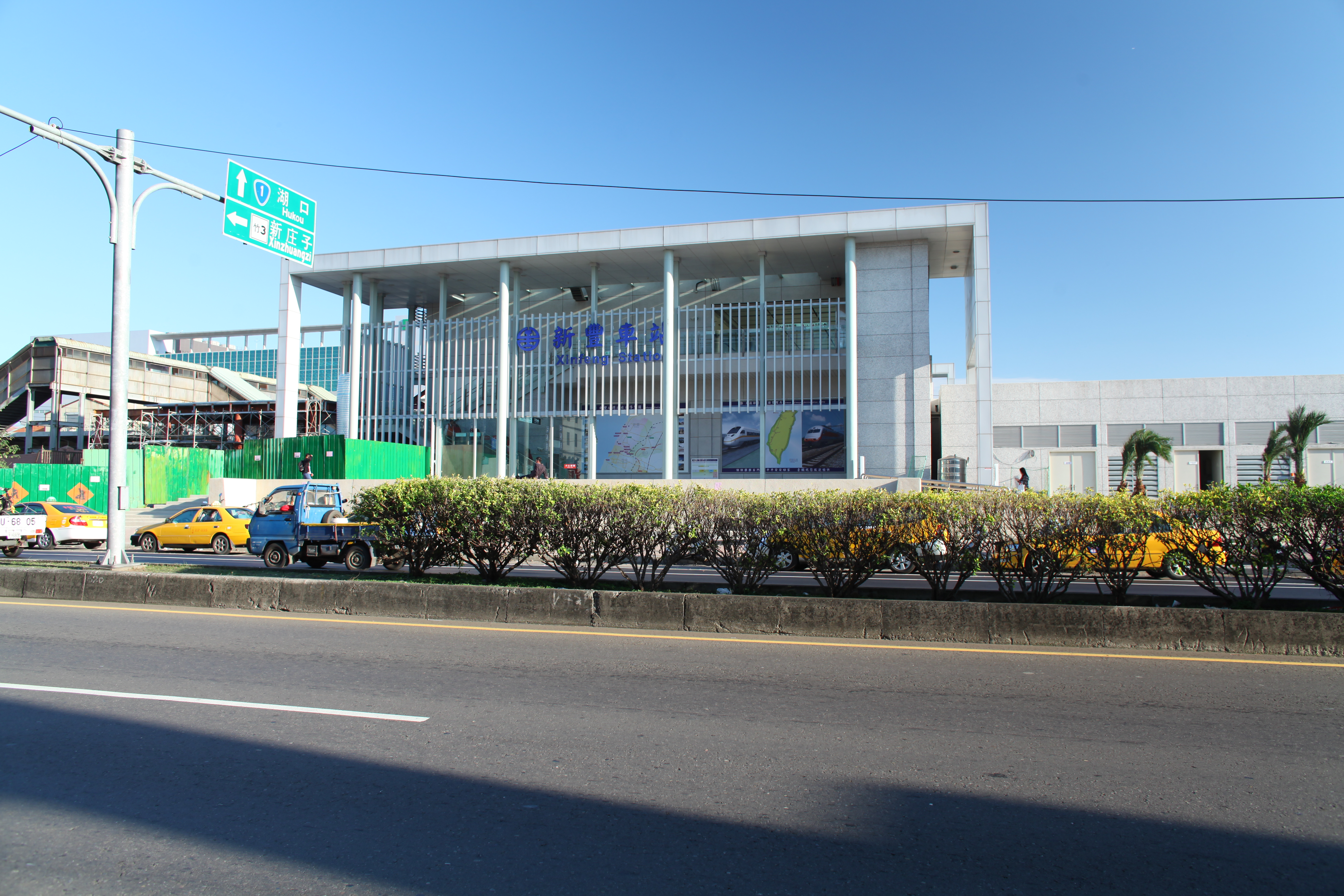

Chinese name
- Traditional Chinese: 新豐車站
Transcriptions
Standard Mandarin
- Hanyu Pinyin: Xīnfēng Chēzhàn
- Bopomofo: ㄒㄧㄣ ㄈㄥ ㄔㄜ ㄓㄢˋ

General information
- Location: Xinfeng, Hsinchu; Taiwan
- Coordinates: 24°52′09.1″N 120°59′47.2″E
- System: Taiwan Railway railway station
- Line: West Coast line
- Distance: 95.8 km to Keelung
- Platforms: 2 island platforms

Construction
- Structure type: At-grade

Other information
- Station code: 113

History
- Opened: 30 October 1893

Passengers
- 2017: 1,919,324 per year
- Rank: 34

Services
Preceding station	Taiwan Railway	Following station
Hukou towards Keelung	Western Trunk line	Zhubei towards Kaohsiung
Location

Xinfeng railway station (Chinese: 新豐車站; pinyin: Xīnfēng Chēzhàn) is a railway station located in Xinfeng Township, Hsinchu County, Taiwan. It is located on the West Coast line and is operated by Taiwan Railway.

== History ==
The railway station building was completed on 30 October 1893. Over the years, it had been renovated and rebuilt several times. Currently the old building is used as a Starbucks store.

== Around the station ==
- Hsinchu Industrial Park
- Little Ding-Dong Science Theme Park
