= Xinfu railway station =

Railway station in Taoyuan, Taiwan

Xinfu Station 新富車站
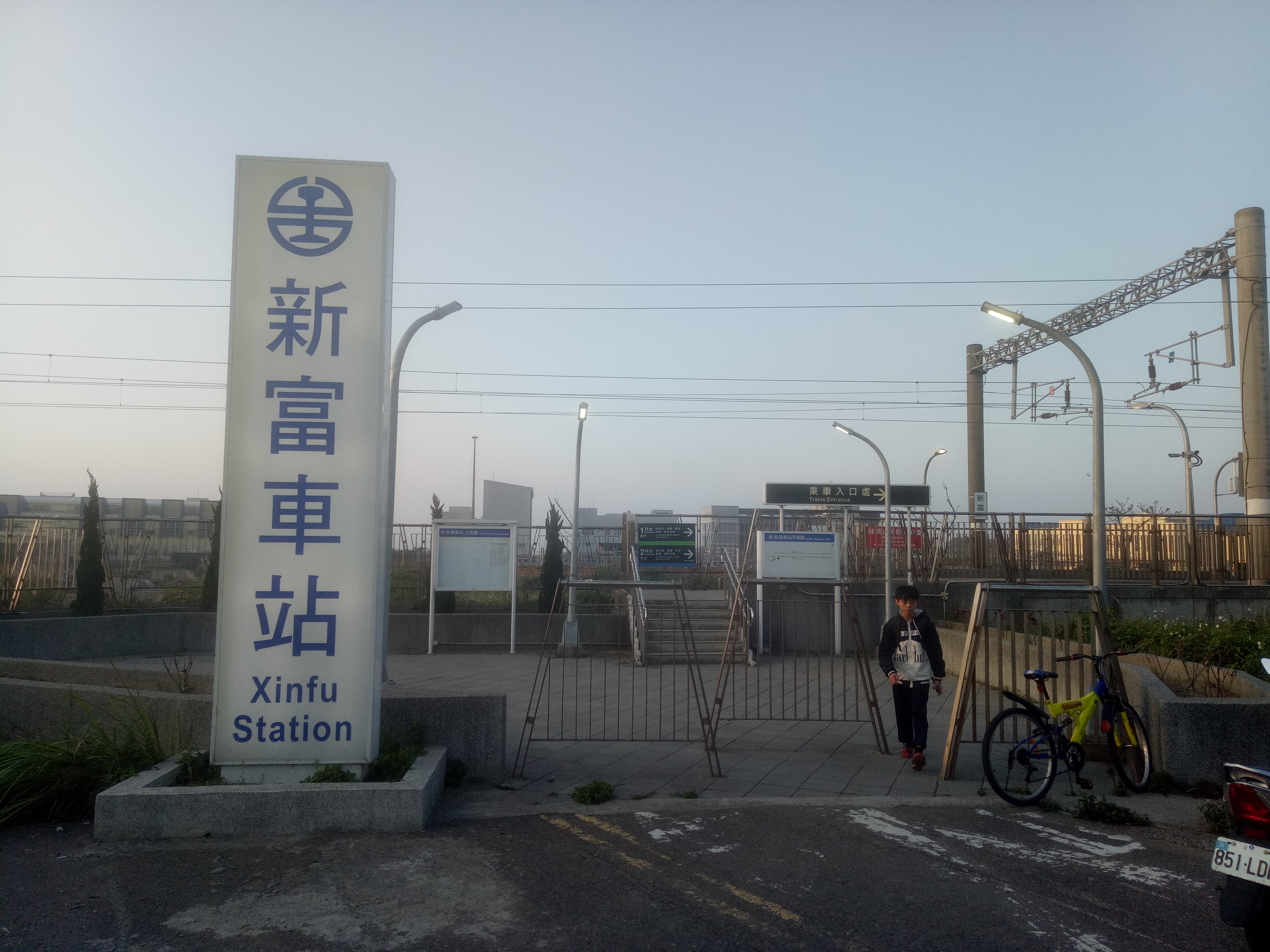

Chinese name
- Traditional Chinese: 新富車站
Transcriptions
Standard Mandarin
- Hanyu Pinyin: Xīnfù Chēzhàn
- Bopomofo: ㄒㄧㄣ ㄈㄨˋ ㄔㄜ ㄓㄢˋ

General information
- Location: Yangmei, Taoyuan; Taiwan
- Coordinates: 24°55′51.8″N 121°04′03.3″E
- System: Taiwan Railway railway station
- Line: West Coast line
- Distance: 85.6 km to Keelung
- Platforms: 2 side platforms

Construction
- Structure type: At-grade

Other information
- Station code: 270

History
- Opened: 6 September 2017

Passengers
- 2017: 4,559 per year

Services
Preceding station	Taiwan Railway	Following station
Fugang towards Keelung	Western Trunk line	Beihu towards Kaohsiung
Location

Xinfu railway station (Chinese: 新富車站; pinyin: Xīnfù Chēzhàn) is a railway station located in Yangmei District, Taoyuan, Taiwan. It is located on the West Coast line and is operated by the Taiwan Railway. The station is located next to TRA Fugang Vehicle Depot.
