= Beihu railway station =

Railway station in Hukou, Hsinchu County, Taiwan

Beihu 北湖
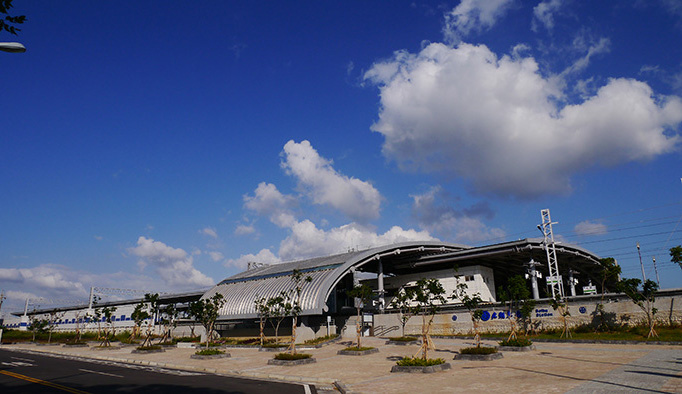

General information
- Location: 1 Beihu Rd. Hukou, Hsinchu County, Taiwan
- Coordinates: 24°55′20.0″N 121°03′20.6″E
- Operated by: Taiwan Railways Administration
- Line: Western Trunk line (271)
- Distance: 87.1 km from Keelung
- Platforms: 2 island platforms

Construction
- Structure type: Underground

Other information
- Station code: 271
- Classification: 簡易站 (Taiwan Railways Administration level)

History
- Opened: 28 September 2012

Passengers
- 1,865 daily (2024)

Services
Preceding station	Taiwan Railway	Following station
Xinfu towards Keelung	Western Trunk line	Hukou towards Kaohsiung
Location

Beihu (traditional Chinese: 北湖車站; simplified Chinese: 北湖车站; pinyin: Běihú Chēzhàn) is a railway station on Taiwan Railway (TR) West Coast line located in Hukou Township, Hsinchu County, Taiwan.

== History ==
The construction of the station was completed in July 2012, as a result of TRA's policy of transforming its railroad lines into MRT-type railroad.

== Around the station ==
- China University of Technology

== See also ==
- List of railway stations in Taiwan
