= Yangmei railway station =

Railway station in Taoyuan, Taiwan

Coordinates: 24°54′51.30″N 121°8′45.18″E

Yangmei 楊梅
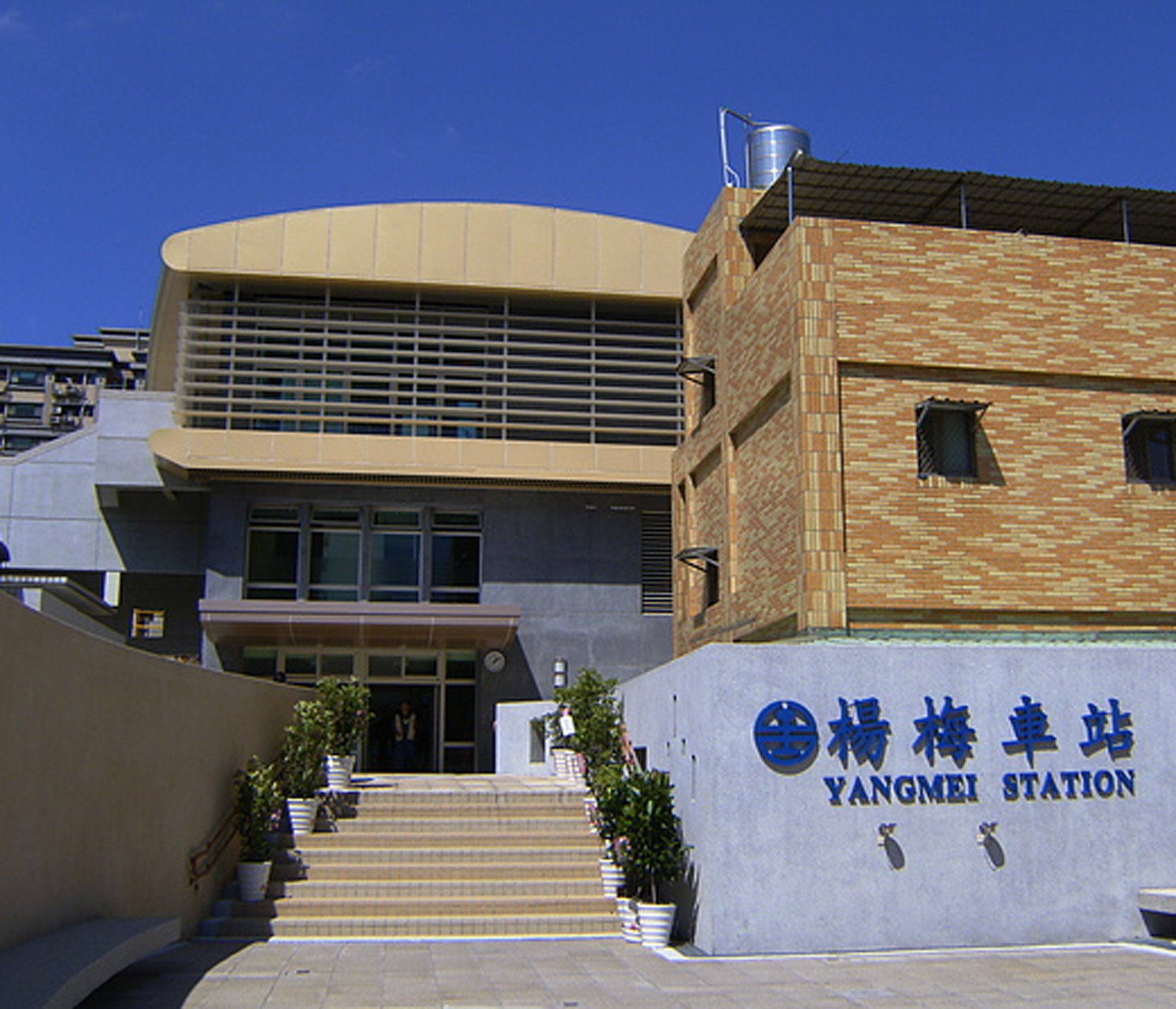

General information
- Location: 256 Dacheng Rd; Yangmei, Taoyuan City; Taiwan
- Operated by: Taiwan Railways Administration
- Line: Western Trunk line (110)
- Distance: 77.1 km from Keelung
- Platforms: 2 island platforms

Construction
- Structure type: Surface

Other information
- Station code: 110
- Classification: 三等站 (Taiwan Railways Administration level)

History
- Opened: 30 October 1893

Passengers
- 10,291 daily (2024)

Services
| Preceding station | Taiwan Railway | Following station |
|---|---|---|
| Puxin towards Keelung | Western Trunk line | Fugang towards Kaohsiung |
Location

Yangmei (Chinese: 楊梅車站; pinyin: Yángméi Chēzhàn) is a railway station on the Taiwan Railways Administration West Coast line located in Yangmei District, Taoyuan City, Taiwan.

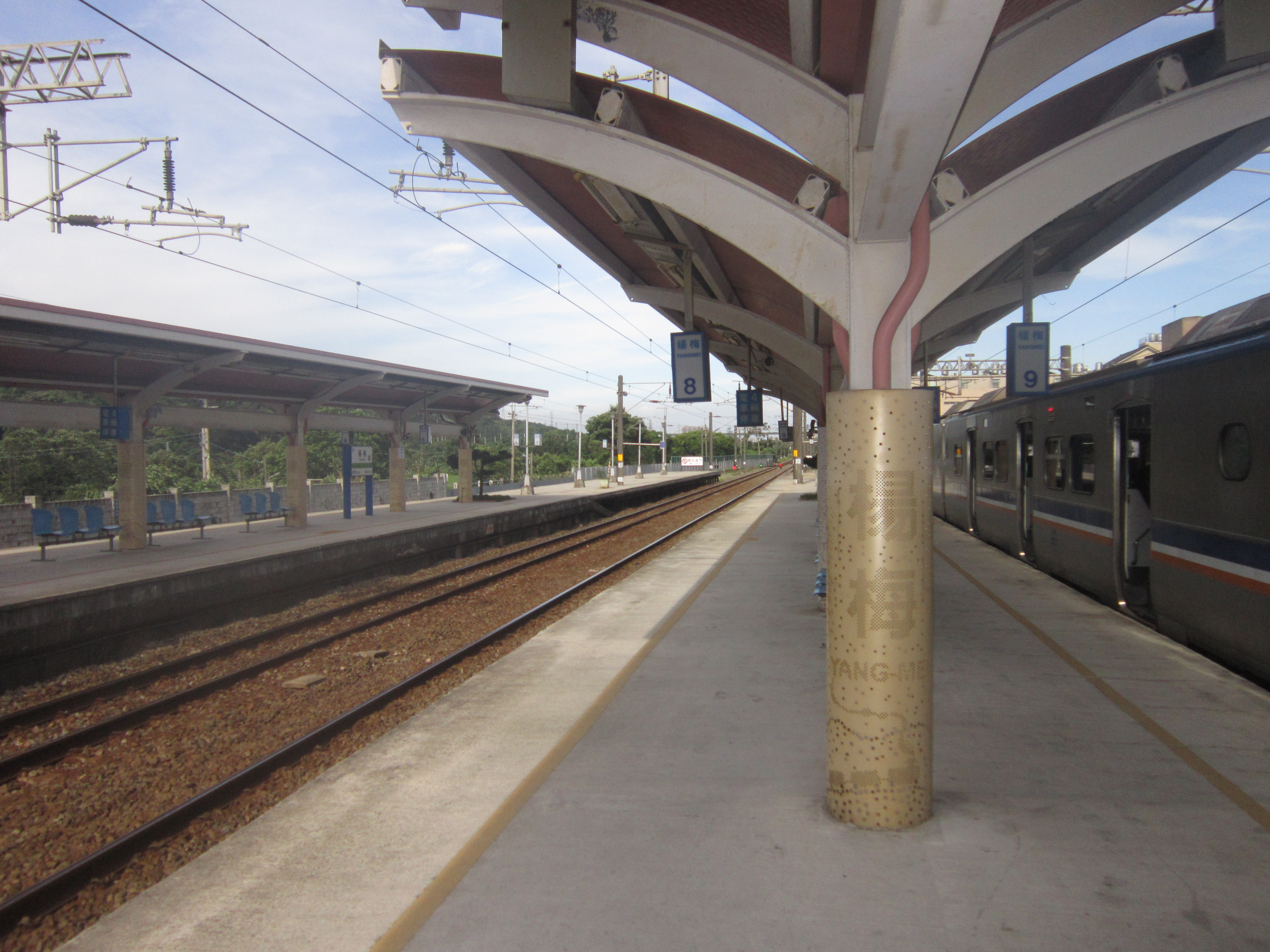
Yangmei station platform

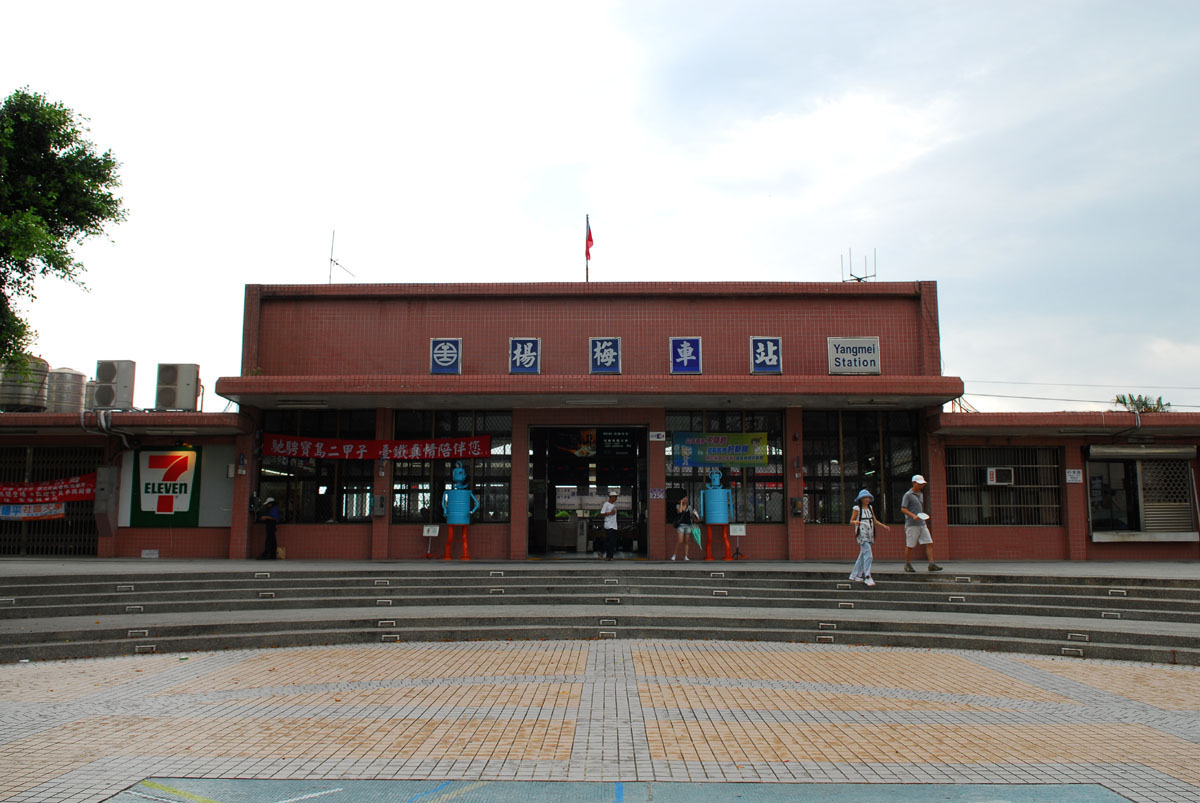
The second-generation station building in July 2007

== History ==
The original station was first opened in 1893 as Tochongxi (頭重溪) station. It was moved to a new location on 20 July 1899 and renamed Yangmeili (楊梅壢停車場) and eventually to its current name in 1920. A new concrete station building was built in 1929.

Taiwan Easy Go contactless smart card faregates were installed at this station on 26 March 2010.

New elevated platforms as well as the third-generation station building were opened in 2010 and 2011 respectively.

== Structure ==
There are two island platforms. Another entrance and an overpass connecting the two entrances of the station are currently being built.

== Service ==
As a minor station, Yangmei station is primarily serviced by local trains. The Tzu-Chiang Limited Express does not stop at this station.

== Around the station ==
- Arwin Charisma Museum Tourist Factory
- Taitung Story Museum

== See also ==
- List of railway stations in Taiwan
