= Hukou, Hsinchu =

Rural township in Hsinchu County, Taiwan

Coordinates: 24°54′N 121°03′E

Hukou Township 湖口鄕
- Rural township
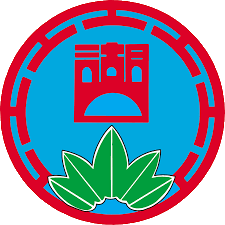
- Seal

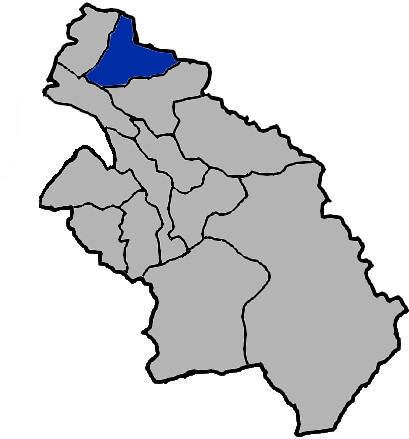
- Hukou Township in Hsinchu County
- Location: Hsinchu County, Taiwan

Area
  - Total: 58.4303 km^{2} (22.5601 sq mi)

Population (February 2023)
  - Total: 81,550
  - Density: 1,396/km^{2} (3,615/sq mi)
- Website: www.hukou.gov.tw

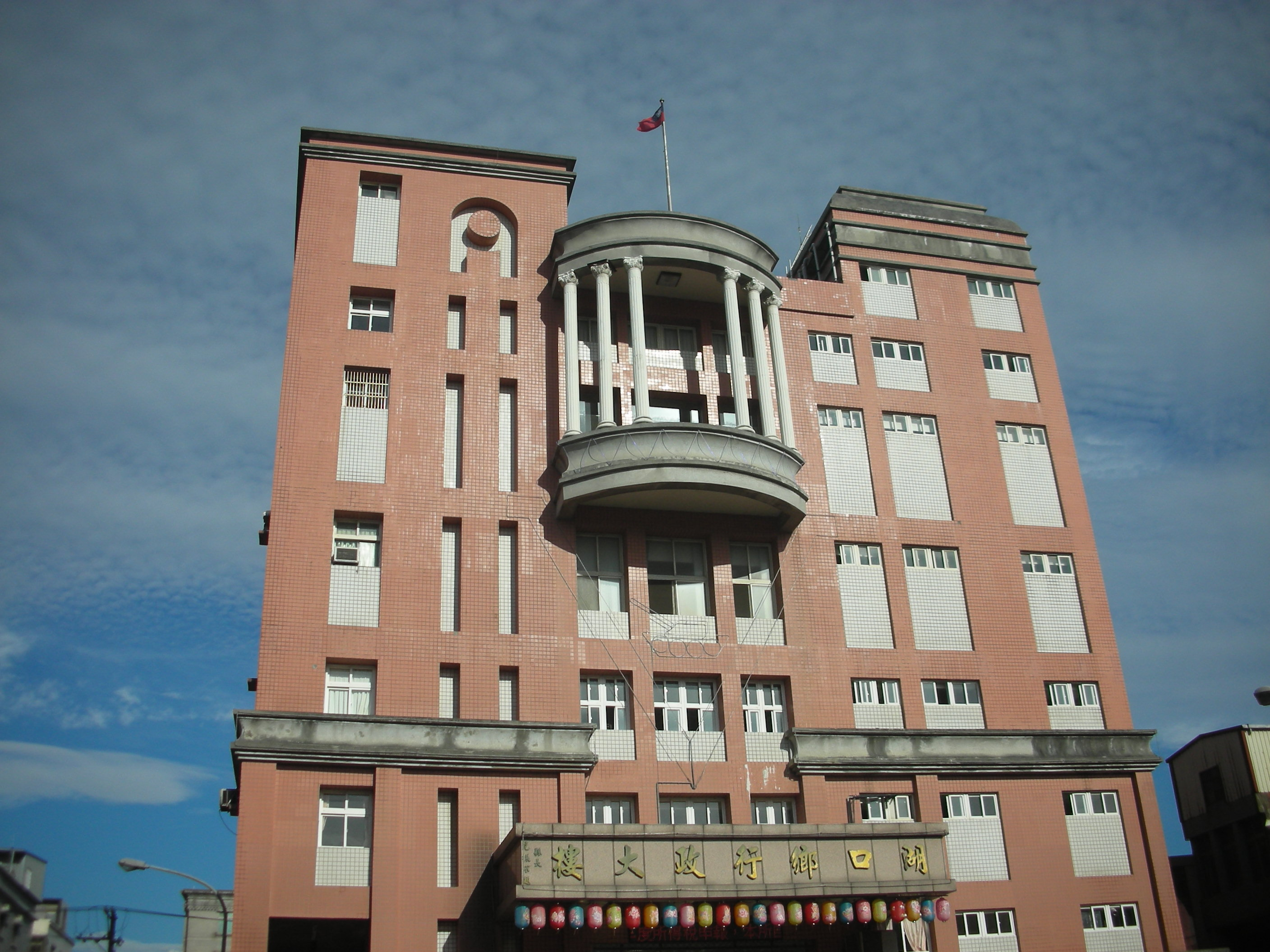
Hukou Township Office

Hukou Township (Chinese: 湖口鄕; pinyin: Húkǒu Xiāng) is a rural township of Hsinchu County, Taiwan. With an area of 58.43 km^{2} (22.56 sq mi), it is the third largest township in the county. Hukou had an estimated population of 81,550 in February 2023.

The Hukou army base houses the 542nd Armor Brigade of the 6th Army Corps of the Republic of China Army.

== Administrative divisions ==
The township comprises 20 villages: Aishi, Boluo, Decheng, Fenghuang, Fengshan, Hexing, Hujing, Hukou, Hunan, Renshi, Shengli, Tungxing, Xiaoshi, Xinshi, Xinyi, Zhangan, Zhangling, Zhongshi, Zhongxing and Zhongzheng.

== Economy ==
The township is home to the Hsinchu Industrial Park.

== Education ==
- China University of Technology, Hsinchu campus
- Hsinchu county Hukou senior high school, incl. grades 7 to 9
- Hsinchu county Xinhu junior high school
- Hsinchu county Chungcheng junior high school
- Hsinchu county Hukou elementary school
- Hsinchu county Changan elementary school
- Hsinchu county Xinshih elementary school
- Hsinchu county Xinhu elementary school
- Hsinchu county Chungxing elementary school
- Hsinchu county Hexing elementary school
- Hsinchu county Huaxing elementary school

Hukou Township
- Chinese: 湖口鄉
- Traditional Chinese: 湖口鄉
Transcriptions
Standard Mandarin
- Hanyu Pinyin: Húkǒu Xiāng
- Bopomofo: ㄏㄨˊ ㄎㄡˇ ㄒㄧㄤ
- IPA: [xǔ.kʰòʊ ʂɻ̩áŋ]
Yue: Cantonese
- Jyutping: hu1 kou3 xiang1

== Tourist attractions ==
- Armor School Museum
- Hukou Old Street
- Sanyuan Temple of Laohukou
- Catholic Church of Laohukou
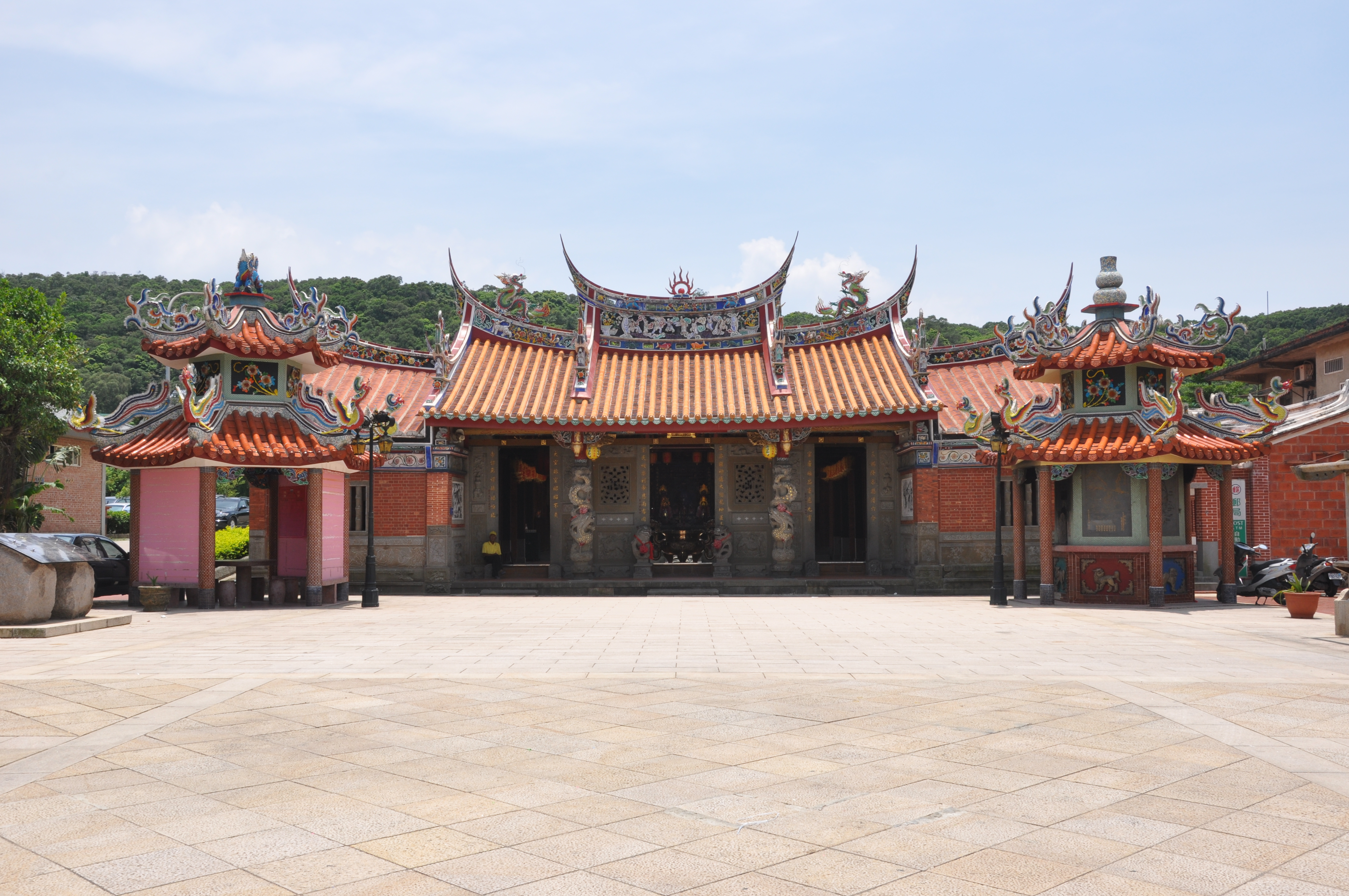
  Hukou Sanyuan Temple

== Transportation ==
=== Rail ===
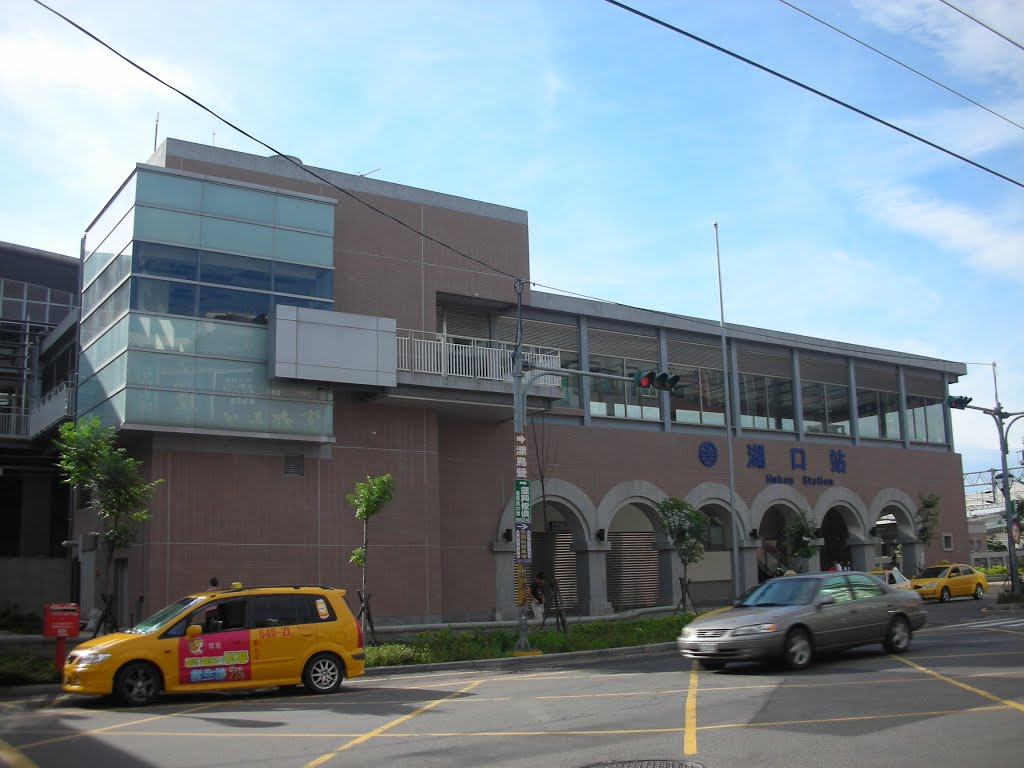
Hukou Station

The Taiwan Railway serves Hukou via the Beihu and Hukou stations.

Taiwan High Speed Rail passes through the central part of the township, but there is no planned station.

=== Road ===
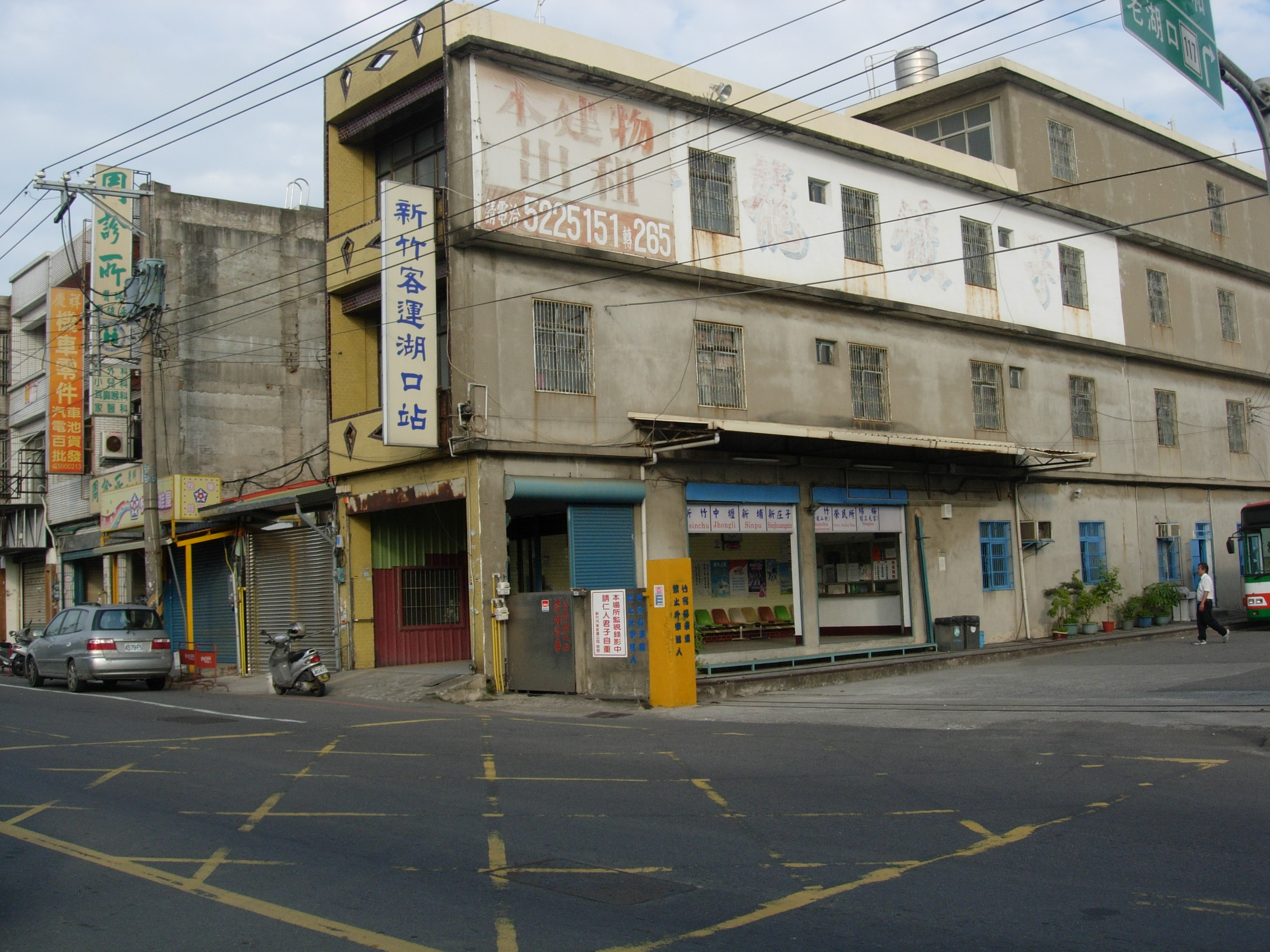
Hukou Bus Station

The bus station in the township of Hukou is called the bus station of Hsinchu Bus Corp.

== Notable natives ==
- Joe Chen, actress, singer and television host
- Fan Chen-tsung, Magistrate of Hsinchu County (1989-1997)
