= Congress Party Alliance =

Political party in Taiwan

Congress Party Alliance 國會政黨聯盟
- Chairperson: Wujue Miaotian
- Vice chairperson: Hsu Hsin-ying
- Spokesperson: Kang Renjun
- General counsel: Alex Tsai
- Founded: 18 October 2018; 7 years ago
- Dissolved: 31 March 2020; 6 years ago
- Merger of: Minkuotang (25 January 2019)
- Headquarters: 4F, No. 88, Section 2, Zhongxiao East Road, Zhongzheng District, Taipei City
- Ideology: Conservatism
- Political position: Right-wing

Party flag

Website
- www.congressparty.tw

The Congress Party Alliance (CPA; Chinese: 國會政黨聯盟; pinyin: Guóhuì Zhèngdǎng Liánméng; Pe̍h-ōe-jī: Kok-hōe Chèng-tóng Liân-bêng) was a political party in Taiwan. The party was established on 18 October 2018 during its inaugural meeting in Taipei City. The Central Party Department was located in the Zhongzheng District of Taipei City. The CPA elected Wujue Miaotian as the first party chairman at the first National Party Congress, and the party was approved by the Ministry of the Interior on 29 November of the same year. The Minkuotang merged into the CPA on 25 January 2019, becoming the first instance of a political party merger in the history of the Republic of China.

== See also ==
- List of political parties in Taiwan
