= Tomioka =

Tomioka may refer to:

- Tomioka, Fukushima, a town in Fukushima Prefecture
  - Tomioka Station, a railway station
- Tomioka, Gunma, a city in Gunma Prefecture
  - Tomioka silk mill
- Tomioka Castle
- Tomioka Ai (冨岡 愛) (born 2002), singer-songwriter
- Eisaku Tomioka (富岡 英作) (born 1964), professional shogi player
- Kihei Tomioka (富岡 喜平) (1932–2007), Japanese cyclist
- Giyū Tomioka (冨岡 義勇), fictional character from the manga Demon Slayer: Kimetsu no Yaiba
