= Fugang railway station =

Railway station located in Taoyuan, Taiwan

Fugang 富岡
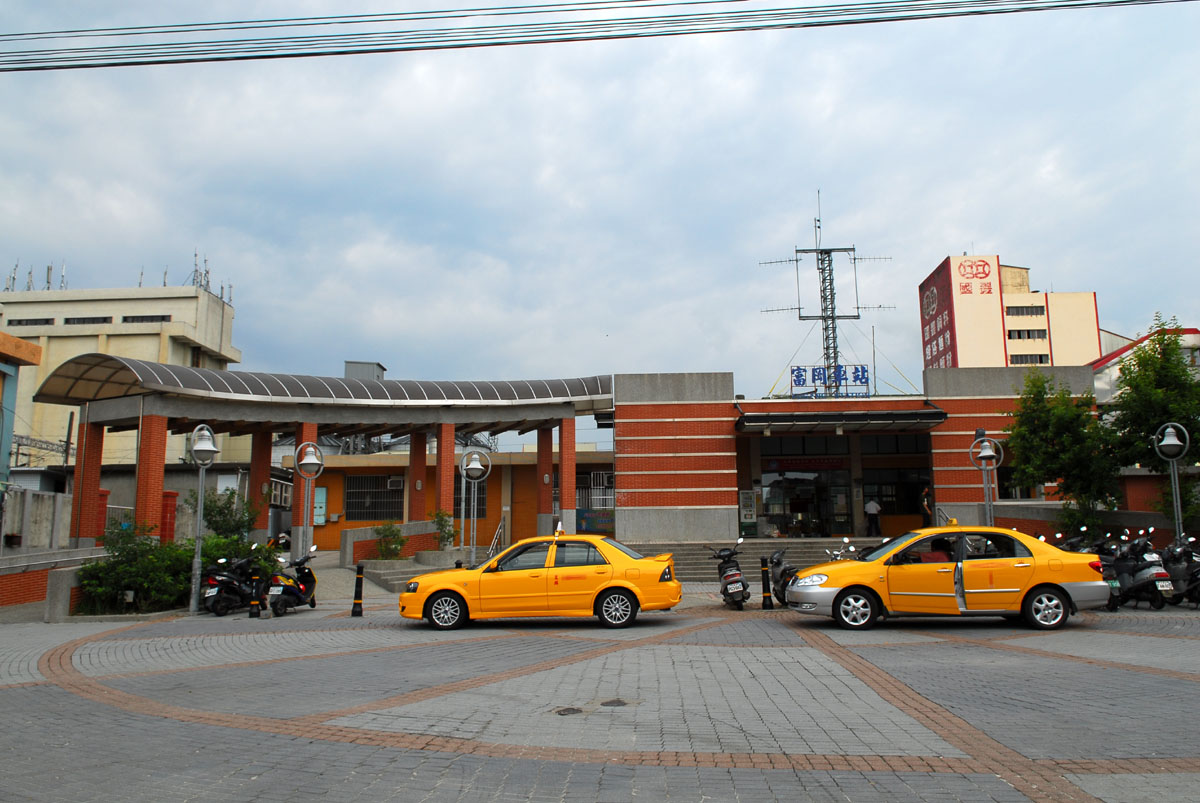

General information
- Location: 37 Chenggong Rd. Yangmei, Taoyuan City, Taiwan
- Coordinates: 24°56′04.0″N 121°04′59.0″E
- Operated by: Taiwan Railway Corporation
- Line: Western Trunk line (111)
- Distance: 83.9 km from Keelung
- Platforms: 2 island platforms

Construction
- Structure type: Surface

Other information
- Station code: 111
- Classification: 三等站 (Taiwan Railways Administration level)

History
- Opened: 1 October 1929

Passengers
- 3,631 daily (2024)

Services
Preceding station	Taiwan Railway	Following station
Yangmei towards Keelung	Western Trunk line	Xinfu towards Kaohsiung
Location

Fugang (traditional Chinese: 富岡車站; simplified Chinese: 富冈车站; pinyin: Fùgāng Chēzhàn) is a railway station on Taiwan Railway West Coast line located in Yangmei District, Taoyuan City, Taiwan.

== History ==
The railway station was originally built in 1929 during the Japanese occupation of Taiwan as Hakukōkau Station (伯公岡驛). In 1955, it was renamed to Fugang. It underwent renovation in 1988 which modified its appearance.

The station is a commuter station and is only served by local trains with less than 12 carriages.

== See also ==
- List of railway stations in Taiwan
