= Hsinchu Industrial Park =

Coordinates: 24.871832°N 121.009957°E

- 新竹工業區
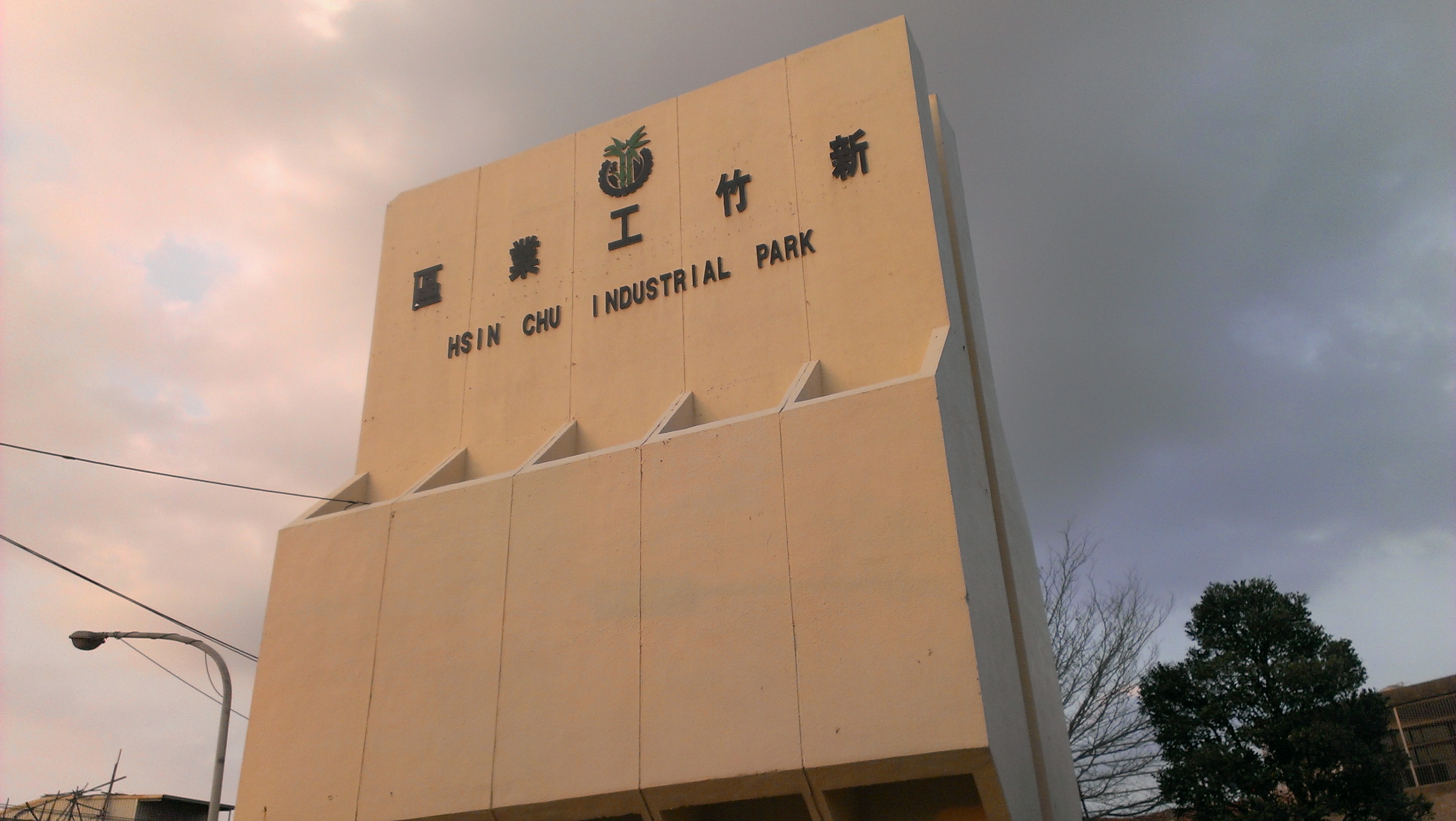
- Interactive map of the Hsinchu Industrial Park area

General information
- Type: Industrial park
- Location: Hukou, Hsinchu County, Taiwan
- Opening: 1977

Website
- Hsinchu Industrial Park Service Center

The Hsinchu Industrial Park (traditional Chinese: 新竹工業區; simplified Chinese: 新竹工业区; pinyin: Xīnzhú Gōngyè Qu) is an industrial park in Hukou Township, Hsinchu County, Taiwan.

== History ==
The industrial park was opened in 1977.

== Transportation ==
The industrial park is accessible within walking distance Western of Xinfeng Station of Taiwan Railway.

== Major companies located in the park ==
- China Motor Corporation
- TRSC
- SYM Motors
- Ritek

== See also ==
- Hsinchu Science Park
