= Minkuotang =

Political party in Taiwan

Minkuotang 民國黨
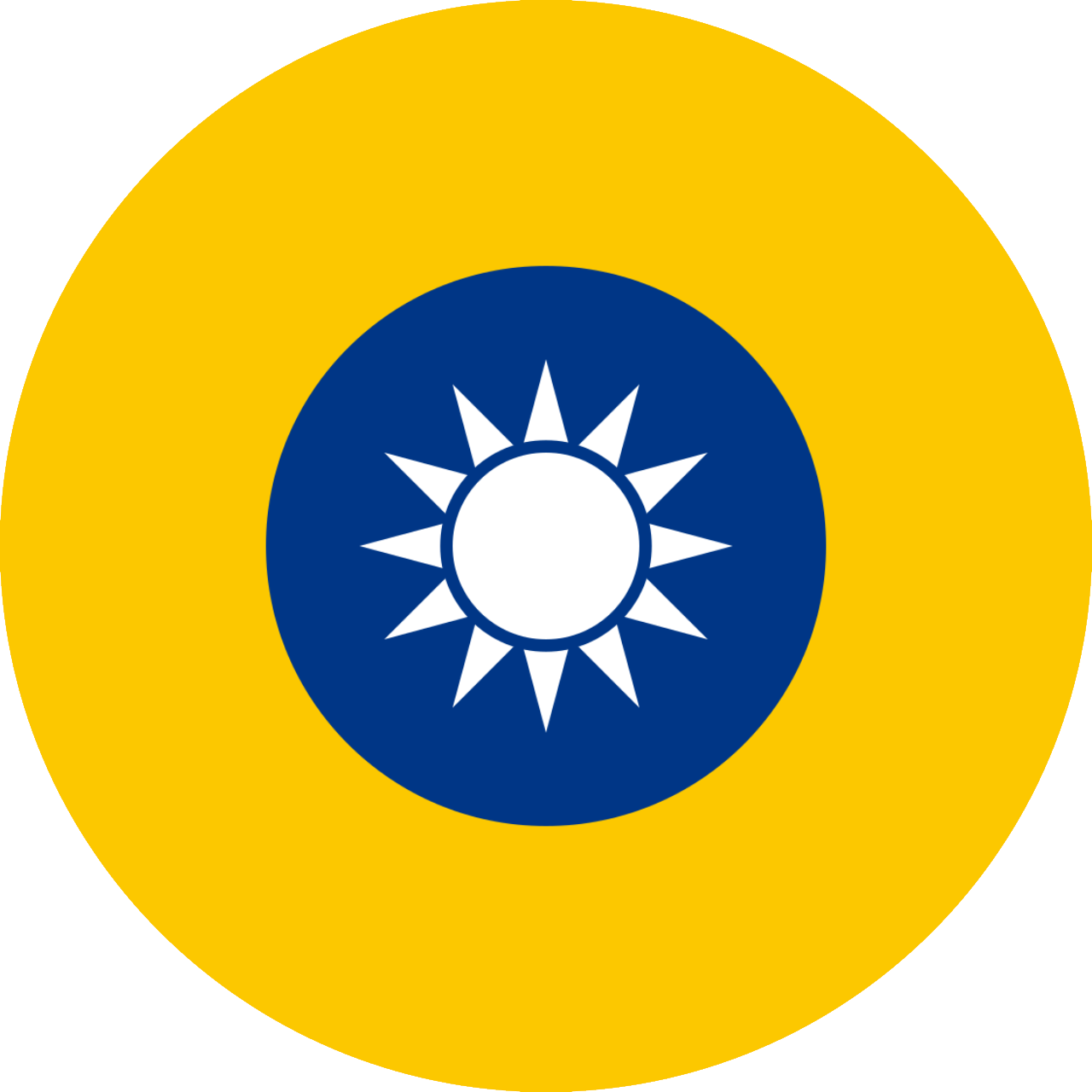
- Chairperson: Wu Hsu-chih
- Founded: 13 March 2015
- Dissolved: 25 January 2019
- Split from: Kuomintang
- Merged into: Congress Party Alliance
- Headquarters: 12F, No. 70-1, Sec. 1, Chengde Road, Datong District, Taipei, Republic of China
- Membership (2015): ~5,000
- Ideology: Three Principles of the People; Pragmatism; Liberal conservatism
- Political position: Centre-right
- Colours: Gold

Party flag

Website
- www.mkt.org.tw

The Minkuotang (Note: In local languages: Traditional Chinese script: 民國黨; Mandarin Pinyin: Mínguó Dǎng; Hokkien: Bîn-kok Tóng; Sixian Hakka: Mìn-koet Tóng) (MKT), also known as the Republican Party, was a political party in the Republic of China (Taiwan). The party was established on 13 March 2015 by former Kuomintang legislative representative Hsu Hsin-ying, with the founding assembly held on 18 March 2015. It was part of the Pan-Blue Coalition and then merged with the newly-formed Congress Party Alliance in 2019.

== Party flag and emblem ==
The party flag of Minkuotang consisted of the National Emblem of the Republic of China in the center with a golden background, representing the party's aim of reviving and making the country wealthy. The flag was controversial for its use of the national emblem in its party flag, but the flag was later approved by the Ministry of the Interior.

== Controversy ==
Soon after its founding in 2015, the party faced allegations that it was funded for religious causes, after it was revealed that prominent religious figure Zen Master Wujue Miaotian was supporting the party for the 2016 general election. Party leader Hsu Hsin-ying denied the allegations, stating that the party "belongs to the people".

== Electoral history ==
Party chair Hsu Hsin-ying switched party affiliations from the Kuomintang to the Minkuotang midway through her term as Hsinchu County legislator. She ran for reelection in the 2016 legislative elections, but quit the race when People First Party chair James Soong chose her to be his vice presidential candidate. The MKT fielded four total candidates in the 2016 elections, and failed to win a seat.

On 25 January 2019, the party was merged with the newly-formed Congress Party Alliance.

=== Local elections ===
Election	Mayors & Magistrates	Councils	Third-level Municipal heads	Third-level Municipal councils	Fourth-level Village heads	Election Leader
2018 unified	0 / 22	3 / 912	0 / 204	0 / 2,148	0 / 7,744	Hsu Hsin-ying

== Chairperson ==
- Hsu Hsin-ying (13 March 2015 – 29 November 2018)

== See also ==
- List of political parties in Taiwan
