= Yangmei District =

District in Taoyuan City, Taiwan

Yangmei 楊梅區 Yōbai
- District
- Yangmei District
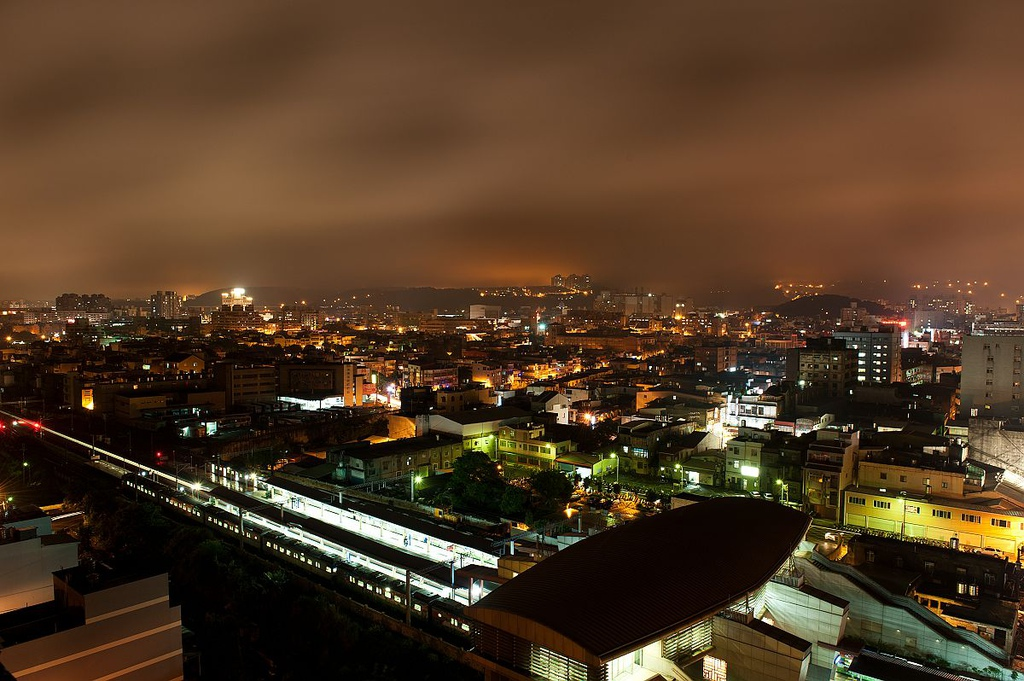

- Coordinates: 24°56′00″N 121°17′00″E
- Country: Republic of China (Taiwan)
- Municipality: Taoyuan City

Government
  - Mayor: Yao Dun-Ming

Area
  - Total: 89.1229 km^{2} (34.4105 sq mi)

Population (February 2023)
  - Total: 178,178
  - Density: 1,999.24/km^{2} (5,178.01/sq mi)
- Website: www.yangmei.tycg.gov.tw (in Chinese)

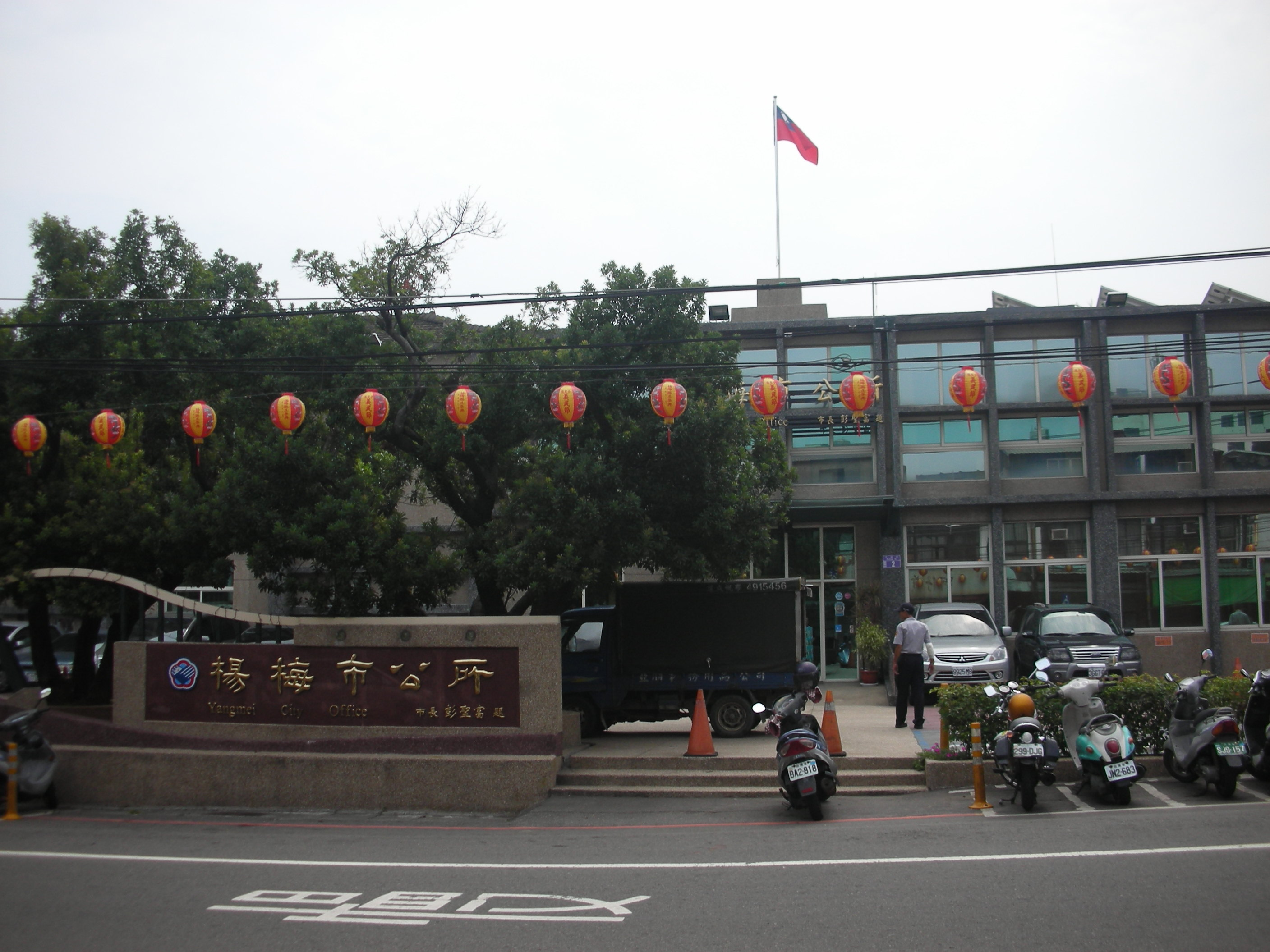
Yangmei District office (then Yangmei City office)

Yangmei District (Chinese: 楊梅區; pinyin: Yángméi Qū) is a district in southwestern Taoyuan City, Taiwan. The centre of the district is Yangmei town itself. The traditional residents are Hakka people.

== History ==
Yangmei town was originally established as Yangmeili (Chinese: 楊梅壢; Pe̍h-ōe-jī: Iûⁿ-mûi-le̍k) during Qing dynasty rule. The name was shortened Yōbai (Japanese: 楊梅) in 1920, during Japanese rule. Under the Republic of China, the former township was upgraded to a county-administered city after passing 150,000 in population. On 25 December 2014, it was upgraded again to a district.

== Geography ==
Yangmei is the third largest district in Taoyuan City. The center is only 40 minutes from the west coast of Taiwan and the Taiwan Strait. To the north it borders Pingzhen District; to the south it borders Hsinchu County. To the east, Yangmei borders Longtan District. The district owes its name from the abundance of Myrica rubra (yangmei trees) when Chinese immigrants entered the area.

- Area: 89.1229 km^{2} (34.4105 mi^{2})
- Population: 178,178 (February 2023)

To the east, Yangmei is circled by foothills which are partly forested. a fair amount of tea plantations can be found in this area. There are also several gated communities in the hilly areas of Yangmei District—Sunny Forest Hill is the biggest and most famous of them. One of the most popular golf clubs in Taiwan, Sunrise Golf and Country Club, is located in the south of Yangmei.

== Administrative divisions ==
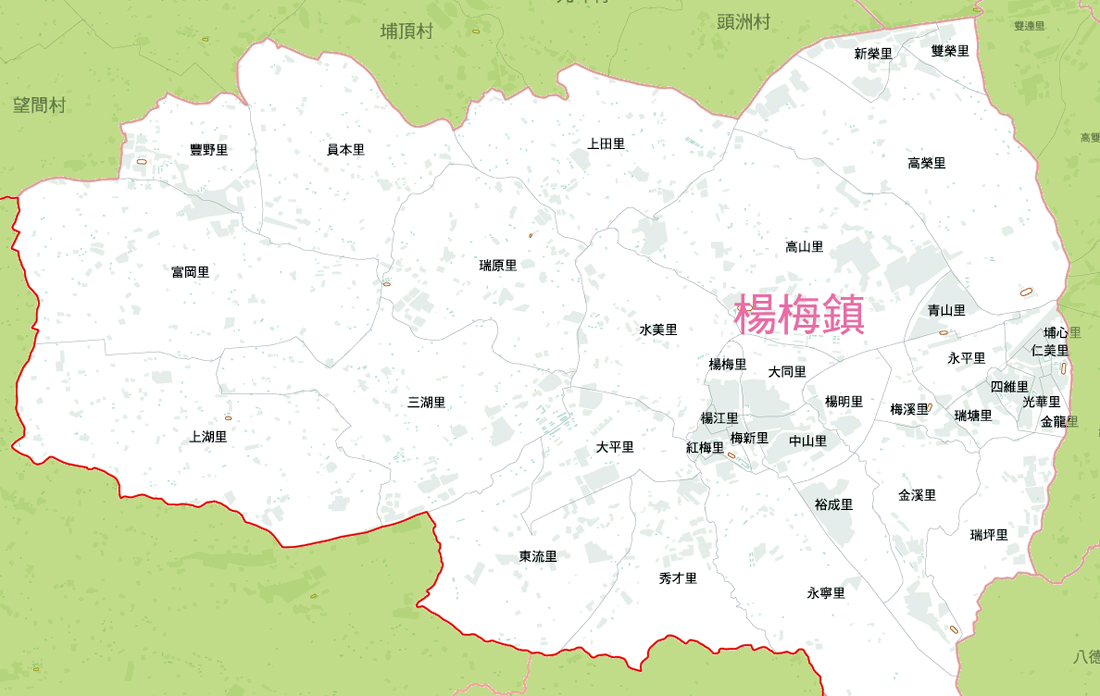
Administrative divisions of Yangmei District (then Yangmei Township)

Renmei, Puxin, Guanghua, Jinlong, Siwei, Yongping, Ruitang, Ruiping, Meixi, Ruixi, Jinxi, Sanmin, Yangming, Yucheng, Yuxin, Datong, Zhongshan, Yangmei, Yangjiang, Meixin, Hongmei, Yongning, Daping, Xiucai, Tungliu, Fengye, Fugang, Fufeng, Yuanben, Sanhu, Touhu, Shanghu, Shangtian, Gaoshan, Gaoshang, Jingshan, Gaorong, Shuangrong, Xinrong, Shuimei and Ruiyuan Village.

== Economy ==
Yangmei has a high-tech industry in the area, with Chunghwa Picture Tube having a factory in the city. One of the largest clusters of TFT-LCD plants are located in the area; Yangmei is also a transport hub with several container terminals present in the city. Maersk Taiwan maintains a distribution center in Yangmei. A fair amount of light industry is also present, with Youth Industrial Park (幼獅工業區) being home to much traditional industry. Another large industrial enterprise in Yangmei is China Motor Corporation, which builds Mitsubishi cars under license.

== Institutions ==
- Tea Research and Extension Station

== Education ==
High schools

- Chih Ping Senior High School (private)
- Ta Hwa Senior High School (private)
- Yangmei Senior High School

Junior high schools

- Fugang Junior High School
- Jenmei Junior High School
- Jhiping Senior High School subsidiary junior school (private)
- Rueiping Junior High School
- Rueiyuan Junior High School
- Tawa Senior High School subsidiary junior school (private)
- Yangguang Junior High School
- Yangmei Junior High School
- Yangming Junior High School

Elementary schools

- Fugang Elementary School
- Rueimei Elementary School
- Rueipu Elementary School
- Rueitang Elementary School
- Rueiyuan Elementary School
- Shehwei Elementary School
- Tatung Elementary School
- Yangguang Elementary School
- Yangmei Elementary School
- Yangming Elementary School
- Yangshing Elementary School

== Tourist attractions ==
- Arwin Charisma Museum Tourist Factory
- Kuo Yuan Ye Museum of Cake and Pastry
- Puxin Ranch
- Yangmei Story Park (楊梅故事園區)
- Yangming Night Market

== Transportation ==
=== Rail ===
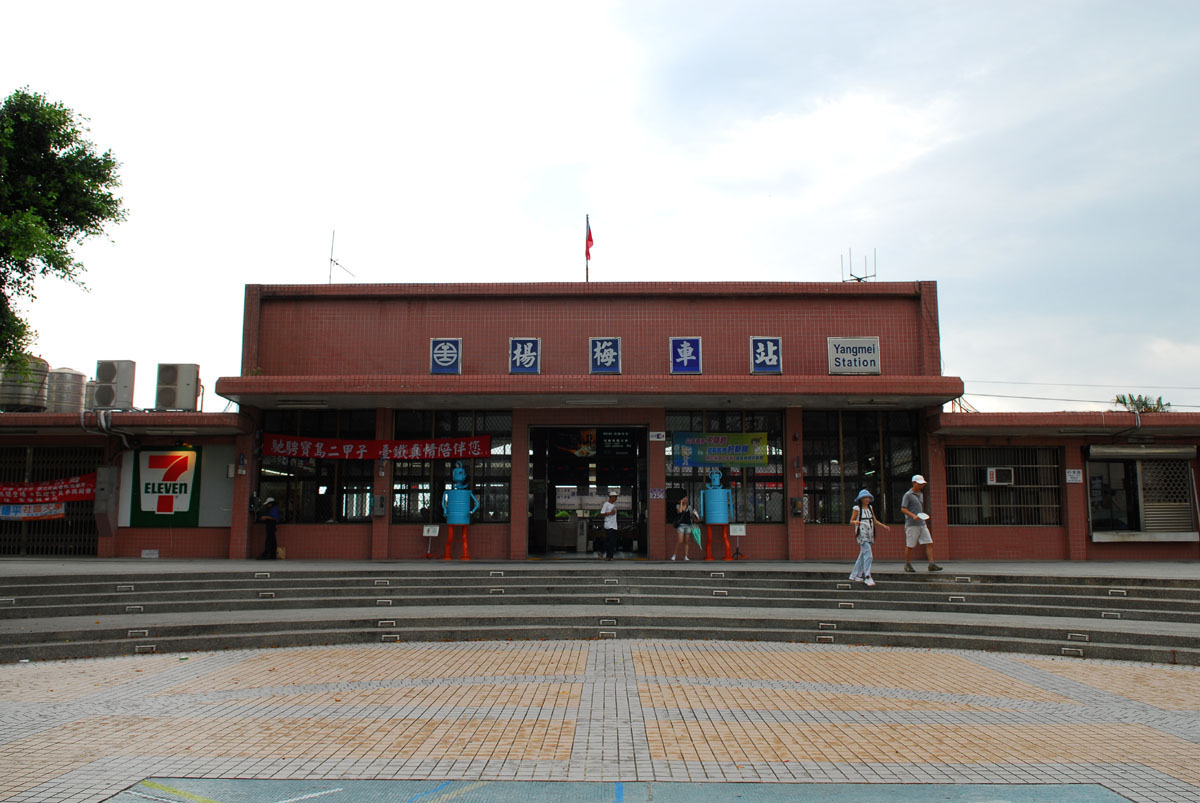
Yangmei Station

Yangmei has four railway stations (from north to south): Puxin, Yangmei, Fugang and Xinfu. The railway is a convenient route for commuters in Yangmei.

The Taiwan High Speed Rail passes through the central part of the district, but there is no planned station.

=== Road ===
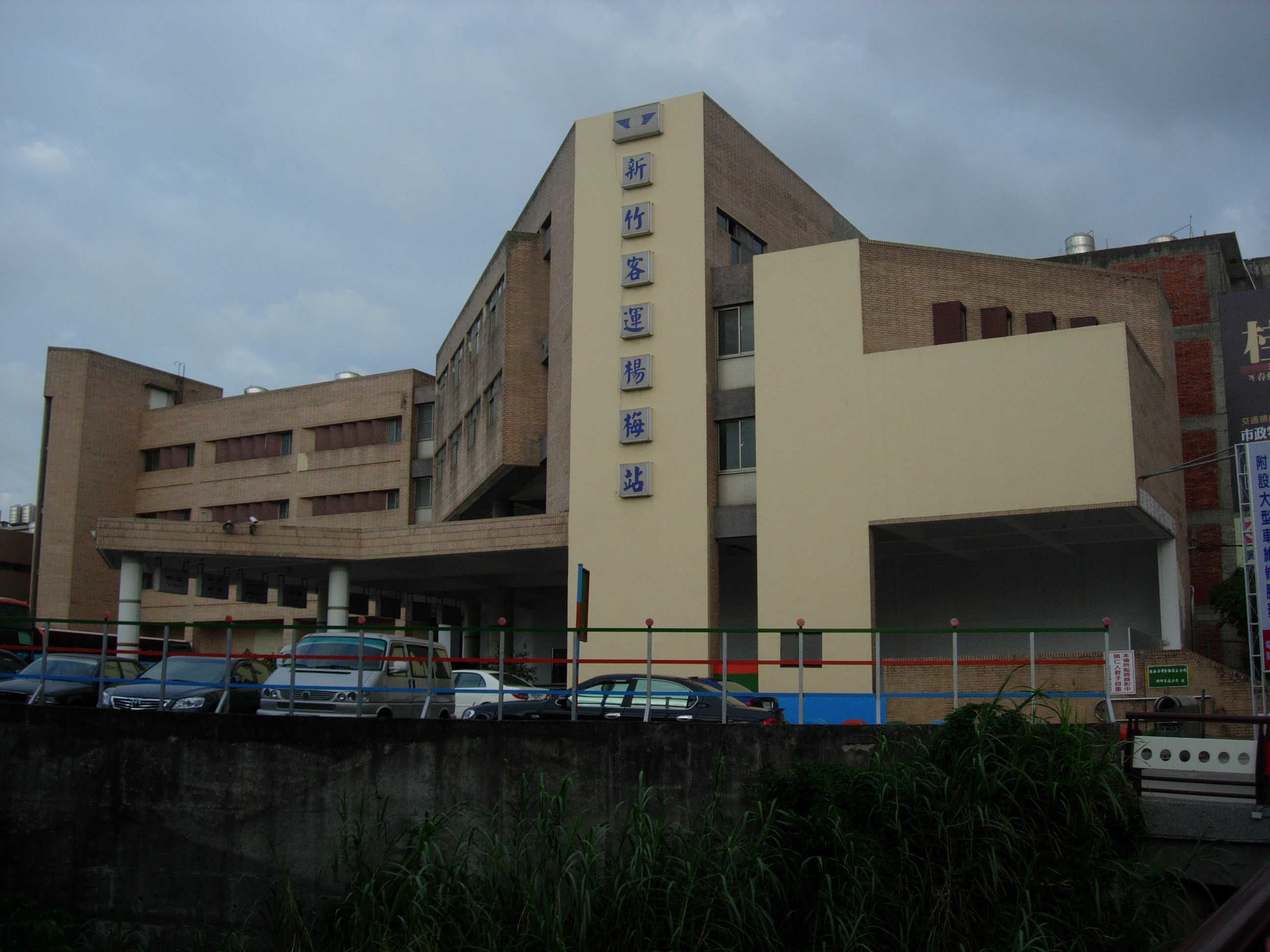
Yangmei Bus Station

The main bus station in the district is Yangmei Bus Station of Hsinchu Bus. Yangmei is served by National Highway No. 1. Generally, it takes about 50 minutes of driving time to get to Taipei City. Provincial Highway 1 also serves the town, so that the transportation system is convenient for travelers.

== Notable people ==
- Cheng Chao-tsun, track and field athlete
- Pu Tze-chun, former vice minister of the Ministry of National Defense (2017–2018)
- Shuhua, performing artist and member of (G)I-DLE

== See also ==
- District (Taiwan)
