= Hakka Americans =

Americans of Hakka birth or descent

客家美國人 hak-kâ mî-koet-ngìn

Total population
- 20,000+ (Taiwan)

Regions with significant populations
- California, Hawaii, New York City, Florida

Languages
- American English, Mandarin, Hakka, Cantonese, African American Vernacular English, Jamaican English

Related ethnic groups
- Chinese Americans, Asian Americans, Taiwanese Americans

Hakka Americans (客家美國人 or 客裔美國人), also called American Hakka, are Han people in the United States of Hakka origin, mostly from present-day Guangdong, Fujian, and Taiwan. Many Hakka Americans have connections to Hakka diaspora in Jamaica, the Caribbean, South East Asia, Latin America, and South America. The Han characters for Hakka (客家) literally mean "guest families". Unlike other Han ethnic groups, the Hakkas are not named after a geographical region, e.g. a province, county or city. The Hakkas usually identify with people who speak the Hakka language or share at least some Hakka ancestry. The earliest Hakka immigrants to what is now the United States mostly went to Hawaii, starting when the Kingdom of Hawaii was an independent sovereign state. After the lifting of the Chinese Exclusion Act by the passage of the Chinese Exclusion Repeal Act in 1943, the Hakka began to come to the US from Taiwan and to a lesser extent Hong Kong, Southeast Asia, Jamaica and the Caribbean.

== Countries of Origin ==
=== Taiwan ===
The first wave of Taiwanese migration to the United States involved mostly post-World War II immigrants from the area now ruled by China (Waishengren), most of whom were not Hakka. Later, the other Taiwanese people, whose ancestors arrived in Taiwan before 1945, including many Hakkas, started immigrating in larger numbers after the 1960s.

It is estimated that there are currently over 20,000 Taiwanese Hakka in the United States.

=== Mainland China ===
Some Hakka Americans came from Meizhou (also called Kaying or Jiaying), Guangdong, China, or otherwise have ancestral roots in that area.

A small number of Hakka came to the continental US before the 1882 Chinese Exclusion Act. Some Hakka also went to Hawaii, where they consisted a significant minority of the population.

=== Jamaica ===
During the 1960s and 1970s, substantial migration of Jamaican Hakkas to the US and Canada occurred. Most Chinese Jamaicans are Hakka; they have a long history in Jamaica. Between 1854 and 1884, nearly 5,000 Hakkas arrived in Jamaica in three major voyages, with some of them subsequently going to the United States. Many of these people also have African ancestry.

== Distribution in the US ==
=== Hawaii ===
A significant minority of early Chinese immigrants to Hawaii, and even fewer to the Continental US, were Hakka, and much of the animosity between the Hakka and Punti Cantonese people carried over. In the first half of the 1800s, around 30 percent of Chinese in Hawaii were of Hakka, while only about 3 percent in the West Coast were Hakka. There was a communal ban on intermarriages between the two groups for the first generation of migrants. In the middle of the 19th century, Hakka immigrants in America were excluded from membership in the Chinese organizations. The largest surge of immigration in that century occurred after an 1876 treaty between the US and Kingdom of Hawaii led to an increased need for labor.

Chinese revolutionary leader Sun Yat-sen lived in Hawaii for several years during his youth.

== Organizations ==
Many organizations have been formed to promote Hakka culture in the US. One group is the New England Hakka Association, which reminds its members not to forget their roots. One example is a blog by Ying Han Brach called "Searching for My Hakka Roots". Another group is the Hakka Association of New York, which aims to promote Hakka culture across the five boroughs of New York City. In the mid-1970s, the Hakka Benevolent Association in San Francisco (San Francisco Jiaying Association) was founded by Tu Chung. The association has strong ties with the San Francisco community and offers scholarships to their young members. The most prominent association in Hawaii is the Tsung Tsin Association (崇正會), which was founded in Honolulu in 1918 under the name Nin Fo Fui Kon (人和會館). It provides scholarships to US citizens in Hawaii that are preferably of Hakka background and/or interested in the Hakka culture.

== Languages ==
The American Community Survey reported that 1,350 people in the United States speak Hakka at home. The actual number may be much higher because some respondents just filled out their response as "Chinese". Some Hakka Americans speak Mandarin Chinese or Cantonese instead.

== Cuisine ==
There are some restaurants in the U.S. serving Hakka cuisine. American food writer Linda Lau Anusasananan wrote a popular Hakka cookbook simply titled, The Hakka Cookbook (University of California Press, 2014).

== Notable people ==
- Anya Ayoung-Chee (born 1981), Trinidadian fashion designer, model and television host
- Lisa Biagiotti (born 1979), filmmaker and journalist based in Los Angeles
- Shu-Park Chan (1929–2013), Chinese-born electrical engineer who served for many years as a professor at Santa Clara University and went on to found International Technological University and serve as its first president
- Steven N. S. Cheung (born 1935), Hong-Kong-born American economist who specializes in the fields of transaction costs and property rights
- Clive Chin (born 1954), Jamaican record producer
- Dennis Chin (1937–2003), soccer player
- Shawn Chin (born 1989), soccer player
- Vincent "Randy" Chin (1937–2003), Jamaican record producer and label owner who ran the Randy's shop
- David Chiu, (邱信福, born 1970), American politician currently serving in the California State Assembly
- Ting-Chao Chou (周廷潮, born 1938), Hakka American theoretical biologist, pharmacologist, cancer researcher and inventor
- Lesley Ma (born 1980, Ma Wei-chung, 馬唯中), younger daughter of Republic of China (Taiwan) President Ma Ying-jeou
- Mark Chung (born 1970), soccer player
- Supa Dups, born Dwayne Chin-Quee, Jamaican record producer, a drummer, and selector based in Miami, Florida
- Goo Kim Fui (1835–1908) merchant, community leader, and philanthropist in Hawaii
- Kong Tai Heong (1875–1951), first female Hakka doctor in Hawaii
- MC Jin (born 1982), born Jin Au-Yeung, Hong Kong American rapper, songwriter
- Paula Williams Madison (born 1953), American journalist, writer, businessperson, and executive
- Carolyn Lei-Lanilau (born 1946), American poet and academic
- Li Tiejun (1904–2002), Kuomintang general
- Liao Zhongkai (1877–1925), American-born, a Kuomintang leader, financier and assassination victim
- Cho-Liang Lin (林昭亮, born 1960), Taiwanese American violinist who is renowned for his appearances as a soloist with major orchestras
- Dyana Liu (born 1981), Taiwanese-born American actress
- Patrick Soon-Shiong (黄馨祥, born 1952), South African surgeon, medical researcher, businessman, philanthropist, and professor at University of California at Los Angeles
- Sun Fo or Sun Ke (孫科 1891–1973), courtesy name Zhesheng (哲生), high-ranking official in the government of the Republic of China and the son of Sun Yat-sen, with his first wife Lu Muzhen.
- Nora Sun (孫穗芬, 1937–2011), Chinese American diplomat, businesswoman, and granddaughter of Sun Yat-sen
- Ching W. Tang (鄧青雲, born 1947), Hong Kong-born American physical chemist
- Paul Tseng (1959–2009), Taiwanese-born American and Canadian applied mathematician and a professor at the Department of Mathematics at the University of Washington
- Joanna Wang (王若琳), Taiwanese-American singer-songwriter, daughter of renowned music producer Wang Zhi-ping (王治平)
- Lianxing Wen (温联星) (born 1968), Chinese seismologist, geodynamicist and planetary scientist
- Shing-Tung Yau (丘成桐; born 1949), Chinese-born American mathematician. He was awarded the Fields Medal in 1982
- Yiaway Yeh (葉亞威, born 1978), former city councilmember and mayor of Palo Alto, California
- Amos Yong (born 1965), Asian American Pentecostal theologian
- Katherine Young (1901–2005), American centenarian and alleged oldest internet user
- Gene Yu (余靖), United States Military Academy graduate, former U.S. Army Special Forces officer and author, nephew of Ma Ying-jeou
- Patsy Yuen (born 1952), Jamaican costume designer and beauty queen
- Kane Kosugi

== Bibliography ==
- Leo, Jessieca (2015). Global Hakka: Hakka Identity in the Remaking. Brill.
