= Ma–Xi meeting =

Ma–Xi meeting may refer to two meetings between Ma Ying-jeou and Xi Jinping.

- First Ma–Xi meeting, Singapore, November 2015
- Second Ma–Xi meeting, Beijing, April 2024
