= Vagts =

Vagts is a surname. Notable people with the surname include:

- Alfred Vagts (1892–1986), German poet and historian
- Detlev F. Vagts (1929–2013), American legal scholar
- Erich Vagts (1896–1980), German politician
