= ECFA Debate =

ECFA TV Debate
- Date: April 25, 2010
- Location: Public Television Service, Neihu District, Taipei, Taiwan
- Participants: Ma Ying-jeou, Tsai Ing-wen

ECFA Debate
- Traditional Chinese: 兩岸經濟協議電視辯論
- Simplified Chinese: 两岸经济协议电视辩论
Transcriptions
Standard Mandarin
- Hanyu Pinyin: liǎng'àn jīngjì xiéyì diànshì biànlùn
Yue: Cantonese
- Jyutping: loeng5 ngon6 ging1 zai3 hip3 ji5 din6 si6 bin6 leon6

1. The Meeting of the Two Yings; 2. The Debate of the Two Yings
- Traditional Chinese: 1. 雙英會; 2. 雙英辯
- Simplified Chinese: 1. 双英会; 2. 双英辩
Transcriptions
Standard Mandarin
- Hanyu Pinyin: 1. shuāng yīng huì 2. shuāng yīng biàn
Yue: Cantonese
- Jyutping: 1. soeng1 jing1 wui6 2. soeng1 jing1 bin6

The Economic Cooperation Framework Agreement Television Debate was a televised debate between the President of the Republic of China, Ma Ying-jeou, who is also chairman of the Nationalist Party (Kuomintang), and the chairperson of Democratic Progressive Party, Tsai Ing-wen, which aired on April 25, 2010.

The term The Meeting of the Two Yings originates from the first character of both leaders' personal names (Chinese: 英; pinyin: yīng). The debate was on the ECFA and related issues, and was broadcast on Sunday of April 25, 2010 by the Public Television Service. This was the first time the Republic of China President held a policy debate with the opposition. Ma himself also claimed the debate to be a first between the president and the opposition party chairperson.

== Debate ==
=== Basic ===
The debate consisted of three parts and lasted for a duration of 142 minutes in total. It focused on the proposed economic agreement between Taiwan and Mainland China called the ECFA. Ma represents the Kuomintang party in government, and claims Taiwan must sign an ECFA with the People's Republic of China in order to prevent Taiwan from being marginalized as a regional economy as other countries in the region become more integrated. Tsai disagreed with these claims, and stated that the government must get consent from the Taiwanese citizens through a referendum before signing the agreement. She expressed concerns that the trade pact could undermine Taiwan's sovereignty and lead to an influx of cheap Chinese products into Taiwan's market, which would hurt local industries with lower profits, higher unemployment and a lower average income.

The second round was held in Taoyuan County (now Taoyuan County). The third round of talks took place on June 12, 2010, in Beijing with an agreement on list of products and services approved for tariff cuts.

=== Content ===
In the debate, Tsai asked if Ma would allow a floodgate of Chinese imports into Taiwan. Ma responded with a guarantee that Chinese agriculture products and labor would not be allowed into Taiwan. The Taiwanese people were not convinced on the issue. Moreover, Tsai said that Taiwan would have to open the whole market internationally within ten years after signing the agreement. The mainland Chinese negotiators were confident when they discussed and negotiated with the Taiwan's representatives in regards to rules of origin, tax reduction for Taiwan's livestock and farming categories to mainland China.

== Comments ==
=== Support ===
The semi-official Chung-hua Institute for Economic Research in Taipei estimates that the agreement could create 260,000 jobs and add 1.7 percent to Taiwan's economy. Economists Dan Rosen and Wang Zhi of the Peterson Institute for International Economics thinks the deal could add a net 5.3 percent to Taiwan's economy by 2020. Rosen and Wang described the ECFA as "an ambitious accord that fundamentally changes the game between Taiwan and China and hence affects the regional economy and even the transpacific tempo for the United States."

=== Criticism ===
There is currently much controversy in Taiwan over the ECFA, including over potential effects on local Taiwanese businesses, as well as on how the government has presented it to the public. The opposition Democratic Progressive Party (DPP) and other pro-independence groups believe the ECFA is a cover for unification with mainland China. Neither does it accord the same rights as a Free Trade Agreement which will reduce manufacturing jobs and average salary, accelerate capital outflow and brain drain of management and technology expertise.

The opponents of the ECFA also indicated concerns about allowing the influx of mainland Chinese white-collar workers or professionals to work in Taiwan which could put the job security of locals at risk. The Bureau of Foreign Trade under the Ministry of Economic Affairs (MOEA) has allayed those concerns indicating the professional job market would not be included in the talks.

In addition, a series of cartoons created by the Ministry of Economic Affairs (Republic of China) attempted to explain the ECFA stereotyped local ethnic groups and their responses to the agreement, and was withdrawn after much controversy.

The opposition party tried to put the ECFA agreement to the Taiwanese public through a referendum. However, the government has denied the proposal on the grounds that the proposal addressed a hypothetical situation and failed to satisfy legal requirements.

== See also ==
- Economic Cooperation Framework Agreement
- Economy of Taiwan
- Economy of China
