= Liao Cheng-hao =

Taiwanese politician (1946–2022)

- 廖正豪

Minister of Justice of the Republic of China
- In office 10 June 1996 – 14 July 1998
- Preceded by: Ma Ying-jeou
- Succeeded by: Cheng Chung-mo

Personal details
- Born: 30 March 1946 Lioujiao, Chiayi County, Taiwan, Republic of China
- Died: 31 January 2022 (aged 75) Beitou, Taipei, Taiwan
- Party: Kuomintang (until 2000; 2005–2022)
- Education: National Taiwan University (LLB, LLM, PhD); University of Tokyo (MA); Stanford University

Liao Cheng-hao (Chinese: 廖正豪; pinyin: Liào Zhèngháo; 30 March 1946 – 31 January 2022) was a Taiwanese legal scholar and lawyer.

== Education and career ==
Liao graduated from National Taiwan University with a Bachelor of Laws (LL.B.) and a Master of Laws (LL.B.). He then earned his Ph.D. in law from the university in 1991. His doctoral dissertation was titled, "Research on negligent crime" (Chinese: 過失犯之研究).

Liao served as deputy director-general of the Government Information Office and Executive Yuan before leading the Ministry of Justice's Investigation Bureau, starting in 1995. Lao was the first MJIB leader without experience in intelligence. During his tenure, MJIB solved several high profile cases, such as corruption on the part of Chou Jen-shen. Liao was elevated to justice minister in 1996 and served until 1998. In his two-year tenure, Liao was well-regarded for confronting organized crime. His opposition to organized crime included refusal to attend the Legislative Yuan's judicial committee meetings while Lo Fu-chu, a lawmaker allegedly associated with gangs, was a committee member. As justice minister, Liao issued an ultimatum for gangs in Taiwan to disband. While Liao led the justice ministry, he pursued former Chiayi County Council speaker Hsiao Teng-piao on a number of charges. Hsiao began avoiding authorities in 1996, and only agreed to face the police in September 1999, more than a year after Liao had stepped down from the justice ministry. Liao's exit from the Ministry of Justice was later attributed to his interference with the Investigation Bureau. Reflecting on the influence of criminals in Taiwanese politics in 2010, Liao stated that the group gained prominence in the late 1980s, in the waning years of the martial law period, and peaked in the 1990s, when a third of county and municipal councilors had criminal backgrounds.

In September 1999, Liao claimed that Vincent Siew had pressured him to wiretap phones illegally and advocated for the ministry to perform other illegal acts. When Lien Chan and Siew formed the Kuomintang ticket for the 2000 presidential election, Liao refused to support the party. Instead, Liao backed independent candidate James Soong. Liao withdrew from the Kuomintang to serve as director of Soong's national campaign headquarters. By 2001, both the People First Party and Kuomintang expressed support for Liao to run for Taipei County Magistrate. The Pan-Blue Coalition later chose Wang Chien-shien as a fusion candidate, and he lost to Su Tseng-chang. In April 2005, Liao regained his Kuomintang membership to run in the party primary for Taipei magistrate. The party nominated Chou Hsi-wei, who won the magistracy.

After withdrawing from politics, Liao established the Tosun Public Interest Foundation to help youth and former prisoners, and advocated for improvement in Cross-Strait relations, focusing on legal and religious aspects. Liao died at Cheng Hsin General Hospital in Beitou, Taipei, on 31 January 2022, at the age of 75.

== See also ==
- Law of the Republic of China
