= East China Sea Peace Initiative =

East China Sea Peace Initiative is a proposal remarked by Ma Ying-jeou, the president of Taiwan at the opening ceremony of an exhibition in Taipei to mark the 60th anniversary of a peace treaty signed between the Republic of China and Japan following the second Sino-Japan War on August 5, 2012.

It called for shelving the dispute around the East China Sea including the Senkaku (Diaoyutai) Islands and suggested to focus on sharing resource rather than claiming sovereignty.

The initiative calls on the relevant parties to:

1. Refrain from taking any antagonistic actions.

2. Shelve controversies and not abandon dialogue.

3. Observe international law and resolve disputes through peaceful means.

4. Seek consensus on a code of conduct in the East China Sea.

5. Establish a mechanism for cooperation on exploring and developing resources in the East China Sea.

Former Minister of Foreign Affairs of Japanese from 2011 to 2012, Kōichirō Genba posted the message on Oct 5 2012 through the Interchange Association Japan. He said that "some parts cannot be consented though; its fundamental idea of seeking peaceful solution is corresponded to Japanese recognition". Some Japanese scholars also think the proposal is constructive.

In 2015, in a written statement in response to questions from the House Committee of Foreign Affairs. U.S. Secretary of State John Kerry said about the existence of competing maritime claims "does not and should not preclude claimants from finding peaceful and effective ways to share and manage resources responsibly" and "this principle, which is enunciated in the East China Sea Peace Initiative, is relevant across maritime Asia".
