= Alfred Vagts =

American historian

- Born: December 1, 1892; Basbeck
- Died: June 19, 1986 (aged 93); Cambridge, Massachusetts, U.S.
- Occupations: Historian, poet
- Notable work: The History Of Militarism
- Children: Detlev F. Vagts

Alfred Hermann Friedrich Vagts (December 1, 1892, in Basbeck – June 19, 1986, in Cambridge, MA) was a German poet and historian.

Vagts served in the First World War as a captain in the German military and was awarded the Iron Cross first class. In the years 1923-1932 Vagts was a historian at the Institut für auswärtige Politik (Institute for Foreign Affairs) at the Hamburg university. In this role Vagts visited the Yale university in the United States where he worked with American historian Charles A. Beard. In 1927 he married Beard's daughter, Miriam. Their son, Detlev, was born in 1929.

In 1932, with the rise of Nazism, the Vagts family left Germany for the UK. In 1933 they moved to the US, where Alfred became a US citizen. Initially he worked as an independent scholar. Between 1938 and 1939, he was a visiting professor at Harvard University before becoming a member of the Institute for Advanced Study at Princeton, where he remained until 1942. Then, until the end of WWII, Vagts served on the Board of Economic Warfare. After the war, and until his death, Vagts continued to work as an independent scholar.

Vagts's work comprises scientific and literary books as well as essays. His most well known work is The History of Militarism, Civilian and Military. Vagts collaborated with Hajo Holborn, Eckhart Kehr, George W. Hallgarten, Fritz T. Epstein and Hans Rosenberg.

== Bibliography ==
- The History Of Militarism, New York, 1937 online
- Beard, Charles A., and Alfred Vagts. "Currents of thought in Historiography." American Historical Review 42.3 (1937): 460–483. online
- "Hopes and Fears of an American-German War, 1870–1915 I." Political Science Quarterly 54.4 (1939): 514-535 online.
- Alfred Vagts and Caroline Farrar Ware, The Cultural Approach to History, 1940
- Hitler's Second Army, Washington, 1943
- Geography in War and Geopolitics, 1943
- Landing Operations: Strategy, Psychology, Tactics, Politics, from Antiquity to 1945, Harrisburg, 1946
- "The balance of power: Growth of an idea." World Politics: A Quarterly Journal of International Relations (1948): 82–101. online
- Defense and Diplomacy: The Soldier and the Conduct of Foreign Relations, London/New York, 1956
- The Military Attaché, Princeton UP, 1967 online
