= Wei Yung =

Taiwanese political scientist and politician

- 魏鏞

Member of the Legislative Yuan
- In office 1 February 1993 – 31 January 1996
- Constituency: Taipei 2

Minister of the Research, Development and Evaluation Commission of the Republic of China
- In office September 1976 – July 1988
- Preceded by: Kuo Cheng
- Succeeded by: Ma Ying-jeou

Personal details
- Born: 5 May 1936 Wuchang, Hupeh, China
- Died: 3 March 2004 (aged 67) Taipei, Taiwan
- Party: Kuomintang
- Education: National Chengchi University (BA); University of Oregon (MA, PhD)

Wei Yung (Chinese: 魏鏞; pinyin: Wèi Yōng; 5 May 1936 – 3 March 2004) was a Taiwanese political scientist and politician. He served as the Minister of the Research, Development and Evaluation Commission from 1976 to 1988 and represented Taipei in the Second Legislative Yuan.

== Education ==
After graduating from Banqiao Senior High School and Taipei Municipal Chien Kuo High School, Wei studied diplomacy at National Chengchi University and graduated with his bachelor's degree in 1959. He then completed graduate studies in the United States, where he earned a Master of Arts (M.A.) in international relations in 1963 and his Ph.D. in political science in 1967 from the University of Oregon. His doctoral dissertation was titled, "Elite Recruitment and Political Crisis: A Study of Political Leadership of the Ch'ing Period".
