= Ting-Chao Chou =

Taiwanese-American theoretical biologist and pharmacologist

- 周廷潮
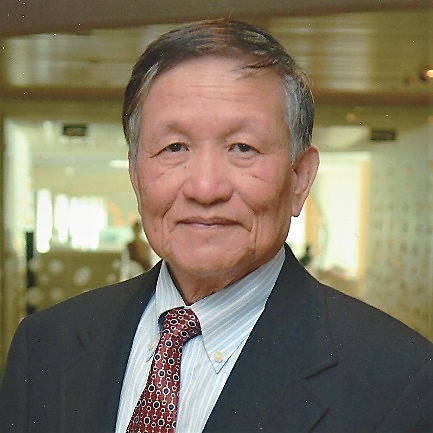
- Born: Shinchiku Prefecture, Taiwan, Empire of Japan
- Education: Kaohsiung Medical University (BS); National Taiwan University (MS); Yale University (PhD)
- Scientific career
- Fields: Theoretical biology
- Workplaces: Yale University; Johns Hopkins University; Cornell University; Memorial Sloan-Kettering Cancer Center
- Thesis: L-Asparagine biosynthesis and its control (1970)
- Doctoral advisor: Robert E. Handschumacher

Ting-Chao Chou (Chinese: 周廷潮; pinyin: Zhōu Tíngcháo) is a Taiwanese-American theoretical biologist, pharmacologist, cancer researcher and inventor.

== Biography ==
Chou was born in Changgangling Village, Hukou Township, Hsinchu County, Japanese Taiwan. His parents were Chao-Yun Chou and Sheng-Mei Chen. His father was a teacher.

=== Education ===
After graduating from National Hsinchu Senior High School, Chou attended medical school at Kaohsiung Medical University, where he earned a Bachelor of Science in pharmaceutical sciences. He then earned a master's degree in medicine from National Taiwan University. In 1965, he began pursuing graduate studies in the United States at Yale University, where he earned his Ph.D. in quantitative biology. He did a postdoctoral fellowship at the Johns Hopkins University School of Medicine in the pharmacology department during 1970–1972.

In 1972 he joined the laboratory of pharmacology at Memorial Sloan Kettering Cancer Center (MSKCC) in New York City as an assistant professor, affiliated to Cornell University Graduate School of Medical Sciences. He became a member and professor in 1988. He retired on June 1, 2013, from the directorship of Preclinical Pharmacology Core Laboratory, Molecular Pharmacology & Chemistry Program of MSKCC, and established the PD Science LLC in 2013 in Paramus, New Jersey, to promote MAL based biodynamics, pharmacodynamics, combination index, and bioinformatics [MAL-BD/PD/CI/BI] theory and application.
