= Fritz T. Epstein =

Scholar and expert on Soviet Union

Fritz T. Epstein (1898 – December 6, 1979) was a scholar and expert on the Soviet Union, born in Sarreguemines, Alsace-Lorraine, then part of the German Empire, in 1898. He emigrated to the United States in the mid-1930s, and after an illustrious career, died in 1979. He was married to a Bertelsmann, by whom he had two children.

== Life ==
Epstein was the son of mathematician Paul Epstein and Alice Betty (née Wiesengrund). On his mother's side he was thus related to Theodor Adorno, since Alice Betty was Adorno's aunt. He graduated to Heidelberg University where his studies were interrupted by the outbreak of World War I. He served in a sound-direction-finding unit (Schallmesstrupp) on the Western Front, and took part in General Ludendorff's Kaiserschlacht (transl. final offensive) in 1918.

At war's end he renewed his studies, focusing on Eastern European history successively at Jena, Frankfurt am Main and Berlin, where he received his PhD, with a dissertation on the court and administration of Russia from the 15th to the 17th century, in 1924. He undertook his Habilitationsschrift at the university of Hamburg, under Richard Salomon, from 1926 to 1931, and Frankfurt University from 1932 to 1933, on the International Relations of the Soviet Union and the Allied Intervention in the post-revolutionary period of civil war of 1917–1921.

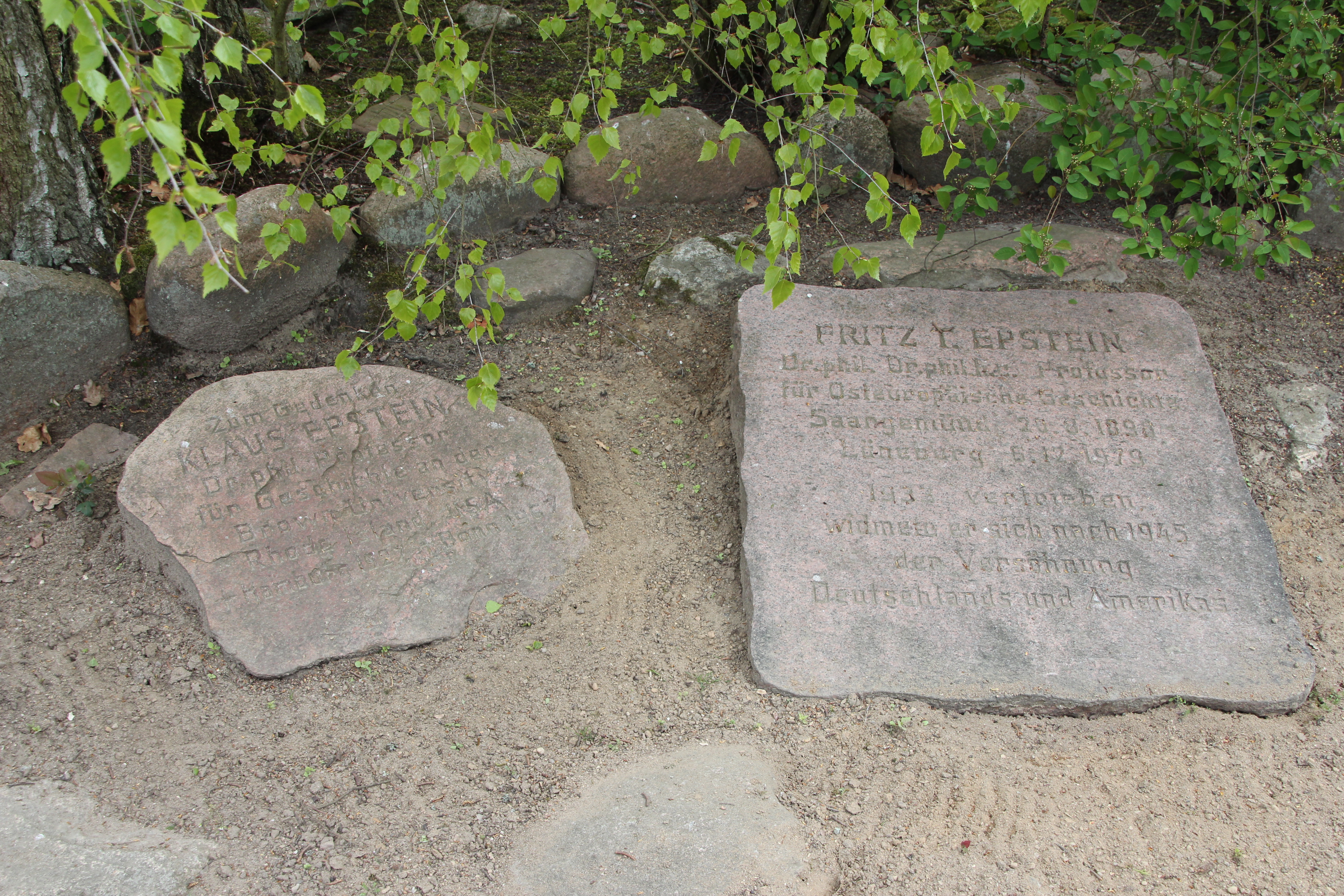
Epstein's grave with a memorial stone to his son Klaus Epstein at the Rehlingen cemetery in Amelinghausen

With the Nazi seizure of power in 1933, his habilitation and any prospect of a career was blocked and he thus moved to London in 1933, to escape Nazi persecution, with the assistance of the Academic Assistance Council (AAC), and subsequently to the United States (1936). He was appointed to the faculty of Harvard University in 1937, and taught there until 1943. During the war he was engaged to work for the U.S. State Department. From 1948 to 1951 he worked as Curator of the Central European and Slavic Collections at the Hoover Institution Library and Archives, Stanford University. He was an authority on the masses of German state documents that were seized by the U.S. in the last days of World War II, and was an adviser and an important influence on William L. Shirer when Shirer was writing The Rise and Fall of the Third Reich (1960).

In 1962, he joined the faculty of Indiana University as professor and curator of the Slavic collections. Epstein retired in 1969 and returned to Germany to live. He died on December 6, 1979.

== Works ==
- (editor) Heinrich von Staden, Aufzeichnungen ueber den Moskauer Staat, Friedrichsen, Hamburg 1930, 2nd., ed. 1964
- Fritz T.Epstein, War-Time Activities of the SS-Ahnenerbe in Baron Max Beloff, (ed.) On the track of tyranny: essays presented by the Wiener Library to Leonard G. Montefiore, on the occasion of his seventieth birthday, Ayer Publishing, 1960 pp. 77–95.

== Sources ==
- Stefan Müller-Doohm,Adorno: a biography, (tr. Rodney Livingstone), Polity, 2005.
- Shirer, William Lawrence (1960), The Rise and Fall of the Third Reich: A History of Nazi Germany, New York City: Simon & Schuster, ASIN B0766DKDLR, LCCN 60006729, OCLC 1286630, OL 5794925M, Wikidata Q138029595
- G. L. Weinberg, 'Note: Fritz T.Epstein, 1898–1979,' Conference Group for Central European History of the American Historical Association. pp. 399ff.
