= Ma Ying-jeou =

President of the Republic of China from 2008 to 2016

- 馬英九
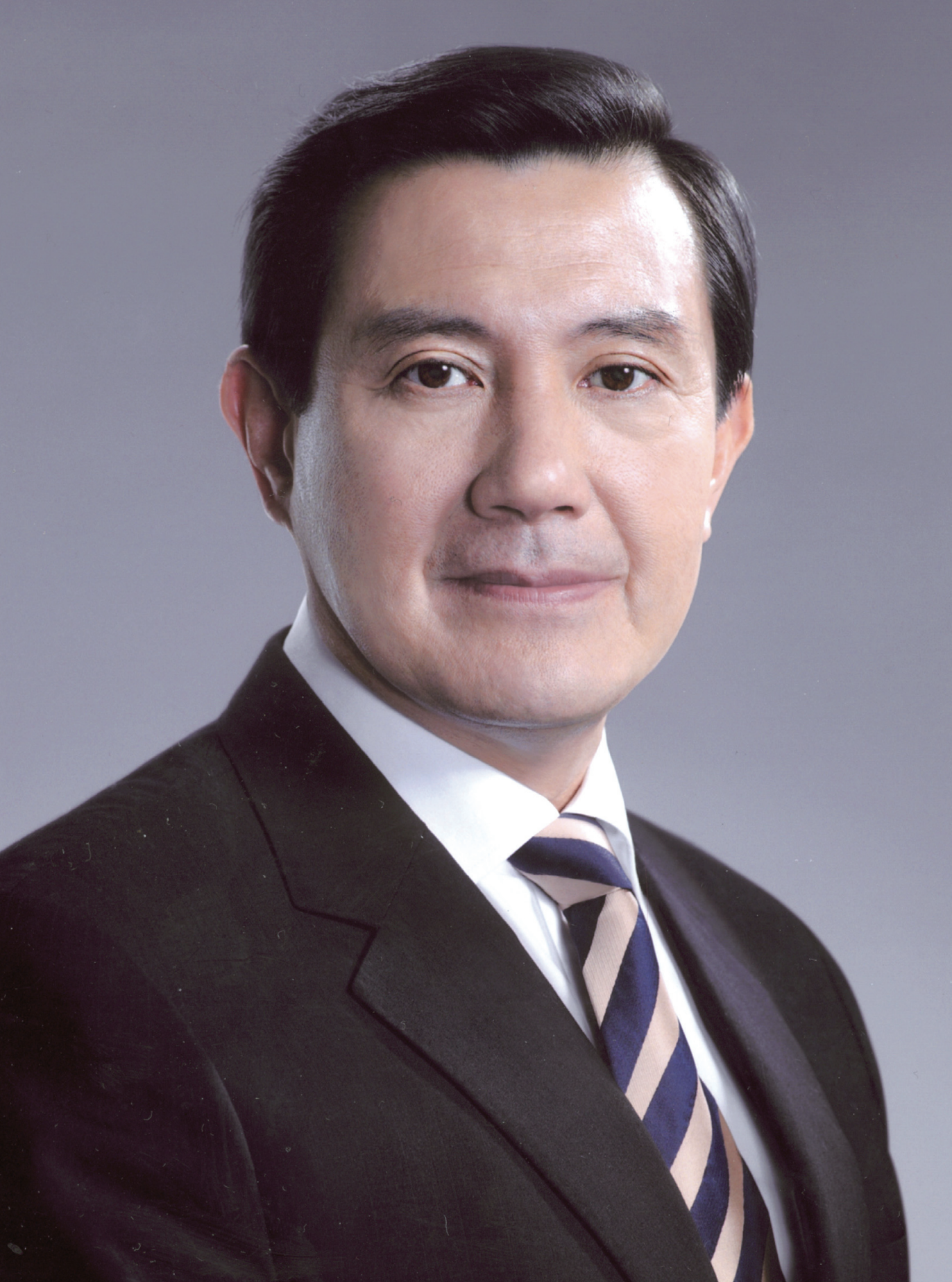
- Official portrait, 2008

6th President of the Republic of China
- In office 20 May 2008 – 20 May 2016
- Premier: See list: Liu Chao-shiuan; Wu Den-yih; Sean Chen; Jiang Yi-huah; Mao Chi-kuo; Chang San-cheng
- Vice President: Vincent Siew; Wu Den-yih
- Preceded by: Chen Shui-bian
- Succeeded by: Tsai Ing-wen

4th & 6th Chairman of the Kuomintang
- In office 17 October 2009 – 3 December 2014
- Preceded by: Wu Po-hsiung
- Succeeded by: Wu Den-yih (acting)
- In office 27 July 2005 – 13 February 2007
- Preceded by: Lien Chan
- Succeeded by: Wu Po-hsiung (interim)

11th Mayor of Taipei
- In office 25 December 1998 – 25 December 2006
- Deputy: King Pu-tsung
- Preceded by: Chen Shui-bian
- Succeeded by: Hau Lung-pin
Ministerial offices
Minister of Justice
In office 27 February 1993 – 10 June 1996
Premier	Lien Chan
Preceded by	Lu Yu-wen
Succeeded by	Liao Cheng-hao
Minister of Research, Development and Evaluation
In office 27 July 1988 – 27 June 1991
Premier	Yu Kuo-hwa; Lee Huan; Hau Pei-tsun
Deputy	Sun Te-hsiung
Preceded by	Wei Yung
Succeeded by	Sun Te-hsiung

Personal details
- Born: 13 July 1950 (age 76) Kowloon, Hong Kong
- Party: Kuomintang
- Spouse: Christine Chow (m. 1977)
- Children: 2, including Lesley
- Education: National Taiwan University (LLB); New York University (LLM); Harvard University (SJD)
- Scientific career
- Fields: International law
- Thesis: Legal Problems of Seabed Boundaries and Foreign Investment in the East China Sea (1981)
- Doctoral advisor: Louis B. Sohn; Detlev F. Vagts

Military service
- Allegiance: Republic of China
- Branch/service: ROC Navy; Marine Corps
- Years of service: 1972–1974
- Rank: Lieutenant

Chinese name
- Traditional Chinese: 馬英九
- Simplified Chinese: 马英九
Transcriptions
Standard Mandarin
- Hanyu Pinyin: Mǎ Yīngjiǔ
- Bopomofo: ㄇㄚˇ ㄧㄥ ㄐㄧㄡˇ
- Gwoyeu Romatzyh: Maa Ingjeou
- Wade–Giles: Ma^{3} Ying^{1}-chiu^{3}
- Tongyong Pinyin: Mǎ Ying-jiǒu
- IPA: [mà íŋ.tɕjòʊ]
Wu
- Romanization: Mo^{2} In^{1}cieu^{2}
Hakka
- Romanization: Mâ Yîn-kiú
Yue: Cantonese
- Jyutping: maa5 jing1 gau2
- IPA: [ma˩˧ jɪŋ˥ kɐw˧˥]
Southern Min
- Hokkien POJ: Má Eng-kiú

Ma Ying-jeou (Chinese: 馬英九; pinyin: Mǎ Yīngjiǔ; /mɑː jiːŋdʒoʊ/ mah YEENG-joh; born 13 July 1950) is a Taiwanese politician, lawyer, and legal scholar who served as the sixth president of the Republic of China from 2008 to 2016. A member of the Kuomintang (KMT), he was previously the mayor of Taipei from 1998 to 2006 and the chairman of the Kuomintang for two terms (2005–2007; 2009–2014).

Ma was born in British Hong Kong to a prominent waishengren family. After graduating from National Taiwan University in 1972, he served in the Republic of China Marine Corps and attained the rank of lieutenant. He then studied law in the United States, earning a master's degree from New York University in 1976 and his doctorate from Harvard University in 1981, both in international law.

Ma began his political career as a bureau director and English translator for President Chiang Ching-kuo. From 1988 to 1996, he held office first as chair of the Research, Development and Evaluation Commission, becoming the youngest cabinet member at age 38, and then as head of the Ministry of Justice, where he launched anti-corruption and anti-drug campaigns. In the 1998 Taipei mayoral election, he successfully ran against incumbent Chen Shui-bian of the Democratic Progressive Party (DPP). During his mayoralty, he was elected as KMT chairman in 2005 and announced his candidacy in the 2008 Taiwanese presidential election, eventually defeating DPP nominee Frank Hsieh in a landslide majority.

Ma's presidency was defined by closer cross-strait relations with mainland China. He initiated a series of cross-strait summits (2008–2015), was elected again as party chairman in 2009, and signed the Economic Cooperation Framework Agreement with the People's Republic of China (PRC) in 2010. After defeating Tsai Ing-wen and being reelected in 2012, his second term saw the September 2013 power struggle and the Sunflower Student Movement protests damage party reputation in the 2014 elections, leading to his resignation as KMT chair. Subsequently, he attended the 2015 Ma–Xi meeting in Singapore, marking the first meeting between the leaders of the PRC and ROC since the Chinese Civil War. After leaving the presidency in 2016, Ma became a law professor at Soochow University and has remained active in KMT politics. He met with Xi Jinping again in 2024.

== Early life ==
Ma was born in Kwong Wah Hospital in Yau Ma Tei, Kowloon, British Hong Kong, on 13 July 1950. (Note: Ma's birthplace later became a topic of political contention during his presidency. He claimed that he "was conceived in Taiwan and grew up in Taiwan." A controversy alleging that Ma was born in Shenzhen and thus was a citizen of the People's Republic of China was dismissed when he publicly presented his birth records.) In a family of five children, he was the fourth child and the only son. He belonged to an upper-class, prominent political family in Taiwan. The family's ancestral home was in Fufeng, Shaanxi; Ma's ancestors had migrated from Shaanxi to Jiangxi and then finally to Hunan. His earliest ancestors include the Chinese general Ma Chao (176–222), who rose to fame in the Three Kingdoms period and was immortalized in the Romance of the Three Kingdoms. He is also of Hakka Chinese descent.

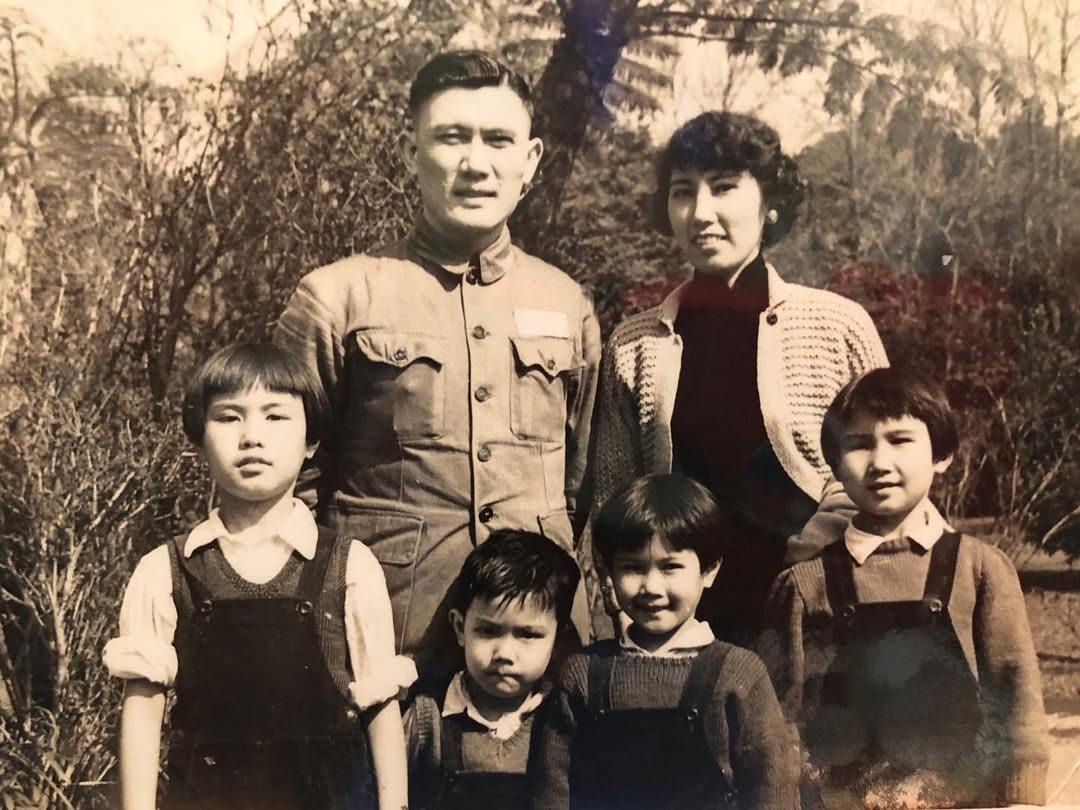
Ma with his parents and sisters, 1955

Ma's mother, Chin Hou-hsiu (秦厚修; 1922–2013), was a well-known civil servant who was born to an educated Chinese family, attended a prestigious school in Changsha, and graduated from National Chengchi University. His father, Ma Ho-ling (馬鶴凌; 1920–2005), was born in Xiangtan and joined the Kuomintang and its youth army in 1941. The couple met as classmates during the Second Sino-Japanese War. Ho-ling moved to Taiwan in 1949 during the Great Retreat but briefly returned to mainland China, where he moved the family from Chongqing to Hong Kong. In October 1951, Ho-ling finally immigrated with the family to Taiwan, where he worked as a mid-rank Kuomintang official.

Ma was an infant when the family moved to Taiwan. Since the family was Catholic, he was raised in the Catholic faith. While growing up in Taiwan in the 1950s, Ma attended Catholic services and went with his grandmother every Sunday to Catholic mass and confession. At age eight, he was reportedly baptised a Catholic at a Catholic church in Hong Kong. (Note: According to his baptismal certificate, Ma's baptism took place on 28 April 1957, at a church on Xiyuan Road in Taipei. The baptizing priest was Vincent van der Rohe, a Belgian missionary. Ma's baptismal name was "Joseph".) He also received a baptism at Resurrection Catholic Church on Dali Street in Taipei near the Huaxi Street Night Market. He remains the only Taiwanese president to have been a member of the Catholic Church.

=== Education ===
Because he was the family's only son, Ma was pressured to succeed academically by his father, who encouraged him to study the Chinese classics, Chinese calligraphy, and practice track and field. In 1966, while a high school student, Ma decided to study law in college after being advised by his father to pursue a career similar to that of Wellington Koo. After graduating from Taipei Municipal Chien Kuo High School, he joined the KMT in June 1968 and became a young activist for the party. He passed with high marks on the General Scholastic Ability Test and was admitted to National Taiwan University (NTU) to study law, enrolling in September 1968.

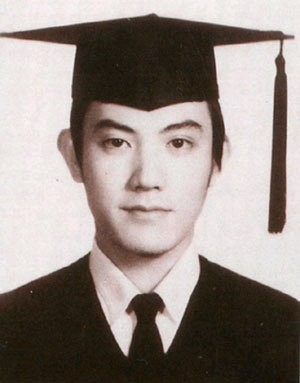
Ma in 1972, a law student at National Taiwan University

As an undergraduate student at NTU, Ma was the leader of a small KMT student group, became secretary-general of the university's student council, and encountered the baodiao movement, in which he became an active member. In his third year at the university, he was selected by the United States Department of State to travel to the U.S. as a student leader for its International Visitors Program and stayed in the country for 70 days from January 1971 to March 1971. Ma traveled to Honolulu, Hawaii, and resided with an American family in San Francisco for three weeks. He visited 20 universities, including the University of Chicago, Harvard University, Georgetown University, and the University of Texas at Austin. Upon returning to Taiwan, he led student groups at NTU to march to the American Institute in Taiwan and the Japan–Taiwan Exchange Association in Taipei in protest of Japanese involvement in the Senkaku Islands dispute.

In 1972, Ma graduated from National Taiwan University with a Bachelor of Laws (LL.B.) degree. After graduation, he was conscripted into the Republic of China Marine Corps and was stationed in Zuoying District. After serving two years in the navy, Ma was awarded the KMT's Sun Yat-sen Scholarship (Note: The Kuomintang Sun Yat-sen Scholarship was established in 1960 to "send outstanding young party members abroad for advanced studies." Other than Ma, recipients of the scholarship include King Pu-tsung and Chiang Pin-kung. When the program was discontinued by the KMT, Ma reinstated it in 2010.) in 1974 to complete graduate studies in the United States, which he used after gaining admittance to New York University (NYU) and then Harvard University. In 1976, he earned his Master of Laws (LL.M.) degree specializing in international law from the New York University School of Law, where he studied public international law under professor Thomas M. Franck and aviation law under professor Andreas Lowenfeld. George Zeitlin, the associate dean at NYU, recognized Ma at graduation for an "outstanding academic record and performance".

Upon completing his master's degree at NYU, Ma enrolled in Harvard Law School as a doctoral student studying under professors Louis B. Sohn, Jerome A. Cohen, and Harold J. Berman. As a doctoral student at Harvard, he attended congressional hearings at the U.S. Congress and served as the editor-in-chief of Free Chinese Monthly, an anti-communist Chinese-language magazine published in Boston. He was also involved as an editor of the Harvard Environmental Law Review, and did research under Judge Richard Reeve Baxter at the International Court of Justice. He was Harvard classmates with future Taiwanese vice-president Annette Lu, diplomat Stephen Orlins, and legal scholar William Alford. Professor Cohen at Harvard, Ma's teacher and mentor, recalled: "he was a brilliant student".

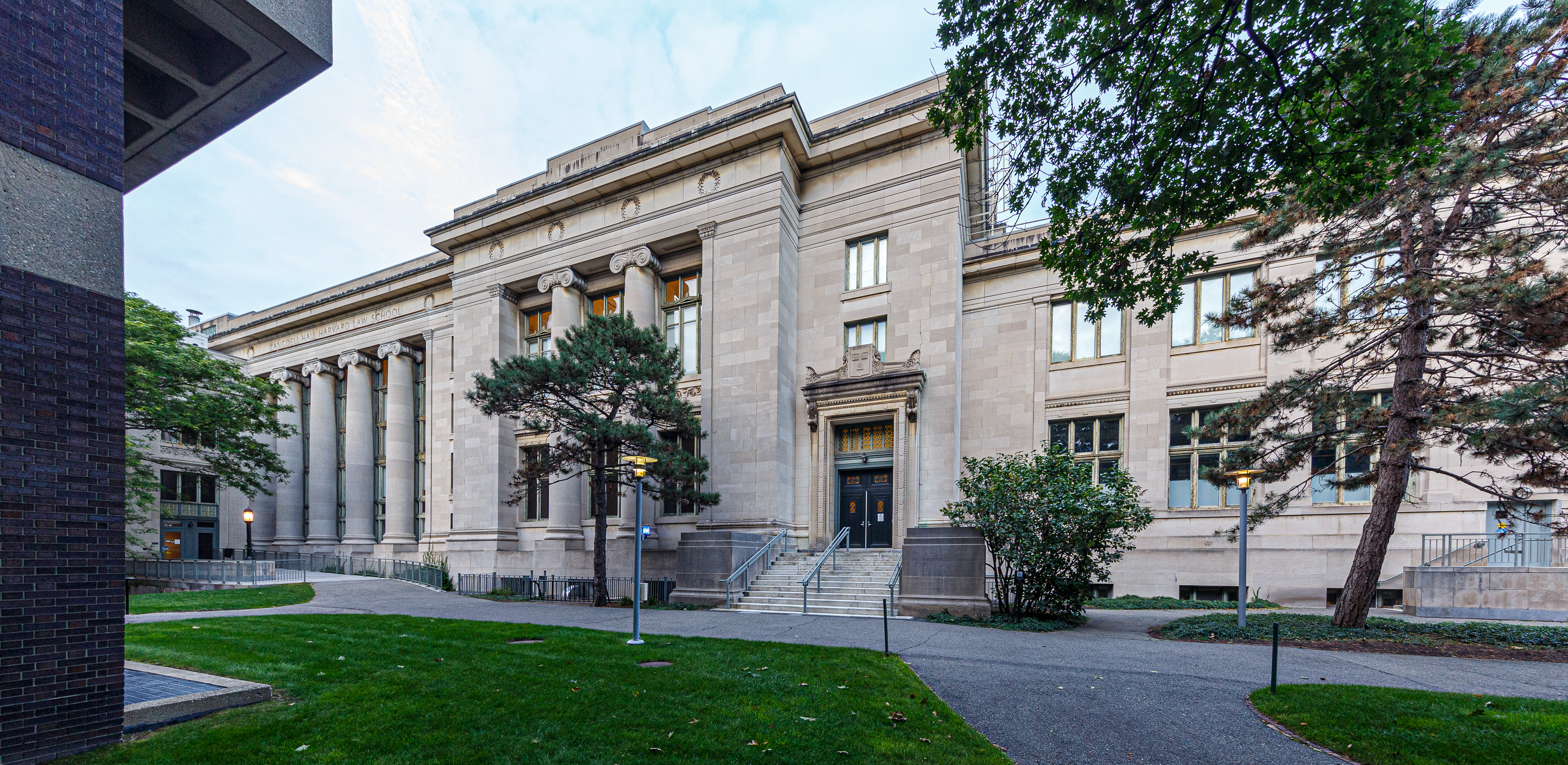
Ma studied at Harvard Law School (pictured in 2024), earning his doctorate in law in 1981 under professors Louis Sohn and Detlev Vagts.

In 1981, Ma received Harvard's most advanced law degree, a Doctor of Juridical Science (S.J.D.), with a specialization in ocean law and international economic law. His doctoral dissertation, completed in December 1980 under the supervision of Sohn and Detlev F. Vagts, was titled, "Trouble over Oily Waters: Legal Problems of Seabed Boundaries and Foreign Investment in the East China Sea". (Note: Ma's dissertation was later published in 1984 by the University of Maryland Law School with a foreword by Louis B. Sohn and a Chinese version was published in 1986 titled "The Diaoyutai Islands and the Seabed Delimitation in the East China Sea under the new law of the sea" (Chinese: 從新海洋法論釣魚台列嶼與東海劃界問題).) The thesis analyzed Sino-Japanese sovereignty conflicts over the Senkaku Islands, focusing on the issue of oil extraction in the East China Sea.

== Early career and rise in politics (1981–1996) ==
After earning his doctorate, Ma worked as an associate attorney for the Wall Street law firm of Cole and Deitz, a legal consultant for the First National Bank of Boston, and as a researcher at the University of Maryland Law School, all from 1980 to 1981. As a researcher at the University of Maryland, College Park under Taiwanese law professor Hungdah Chiu, Ma published some academic papers. Articles he wrote in Taiwanese newspapers on communism and Taiwan–United States relations attracted the attention of President Chiang Ching-kuo. In September 1981, Ma returned to Taiwan and was introduced by Fredrick Chien to President Chiang Ching-kuo, who appointed Ma as his personal English secretary and interpreter. That same year, he became an adjunct associate professor of law at National Chengchi University, a role he remained in until 1998. Ma concurrently served as deputy director of the First Bureau of the Presidential Office. In 1982, he was named the senior secretary of the Office of the President at the Presidential Office Building.

At age 38, Ma was named the chairman of the Research, Development and Evaluation Commission under the Executive Yuan—the cabinet's youngest-ever appointee. He would go on to serve as deputy head of the Mainland Affairs Council (MAC), a cabinet office responsible for managing Taiwan's relationship with mainland China. For his administrative experience and close ties with Chiang, Ma was appointed to multiple KMT party positions after 1984: director of the Mainland Tasks Committee (1988), deputy secretary general of the KMT Central Committee (1990), deputy director of the KMT National Unification Committee (1991), and KMT representative to the National Assembly. In 1987, Chiang tasked Ma to produce a memorandum regarding allowing Taiwanese citizens family visits to China; after it was completed, the report was received favorably by high-ranking KMT officials and implemented. At the time of Chiang's death in 1988, Ma was leading reform efforts regarding censorship in Taiwan.

In 1993, Ma received national attention when President Lee Teng-hui and Premier Lien Chan appointed him as Minister of Justice. At age 43, he was considered a "handsome new official" whose dynamism made him a "darling of public opinion". He initiated hardline policies of prosecuting corruption, power abuse, and political scandals, drawing criticism from KMT party officials, some of whom were involved in, and reliant on, local corruption. Among the anti-corruption programs instituted was the "Taking the Knife to Corruption" plan centered on a doctrine of "incorruptibility and ability" in government. KMT officials complained that he "shook the foundations of the party" as 341 of 883 elected councilmen in 1994 were indicted for buying votes. His campaigns against vote buying while in office earned him the nickname "Mr. Clean". In addition, he began an anti-drug campaign and organized the ministry to restrict narcotics.

Ma built a reputation for honesty as head of the Ministry of Justice due to "frequently jailing politicians, including candidates for elective office, for vote-buying and other corrupt practices". As a result of his tough on crime approach, Ma lost party support and was relieved of the position in 1996, becoming a minister without portfolio. He decided to return to academia afterwards and accepted another teaching position at National Chengchi University. When he left office, Ma was one of the most popular politicians in Taiwan (alongside his ministerial successor, Liao Cheng-hao) and, according to one poll, 76.5% of respondents saw him "playing a major political role within the next two years".

== Mayor of Taipei (1998–2006) ==
=== Election (1998) ===
The 1997 Taiwanese local elections saw the Kuomintang lose a majority of their counties and cities to the Democratic Progressive Party, largely due to the efforts of Chen Shui-bian, Taipei's incumbent mayor, to travel extensively from each county and city for campaigns. Faced with a political crisis, the KMT nominated the popular Ma as its 1998 candidate for the Taipei mayoralty against Chen. Ma ran on a platform of making Taipei a corruption-free "world class city" and used an image of a jogger—a representation of his penchant for jogging and charity work—as the symbol of his campaign. He received the support of incumbent president Lee Teng-hui, who campaigned for Ma and promoted him as a "new Taiwanese" who "loves Taiwan and promotes its interests regardless of his or her place of birth". Ma's campaign slogan was "Taiwan First, Taipei First".

Despite Chen's high public approval rating, Ma won the 1998 Taipei mayoral election with 51.13 percent of the vote, compared to Chen's 45.91 percent share, aided with an undivided KMT conservative voting bloc (as it had been divided with the New Party in the 1994 Taiwanese local elections). Voter turnout was high, averaging 80 percent. The victory was a setback for both the DPP and for Chen's potential candidacy in the 2000 presidential election. The election saw the Hong Kong-born Ma overcome a popular bias against "mainlanders" (waishengren), a group sometimes resented by native Taiwanese. Ma's victory over Chen was also received positively by U.S. and Chinese officials, and the KMT won a legislative majority that year with 123 out of 225 seats.

=== Mayoralty ===
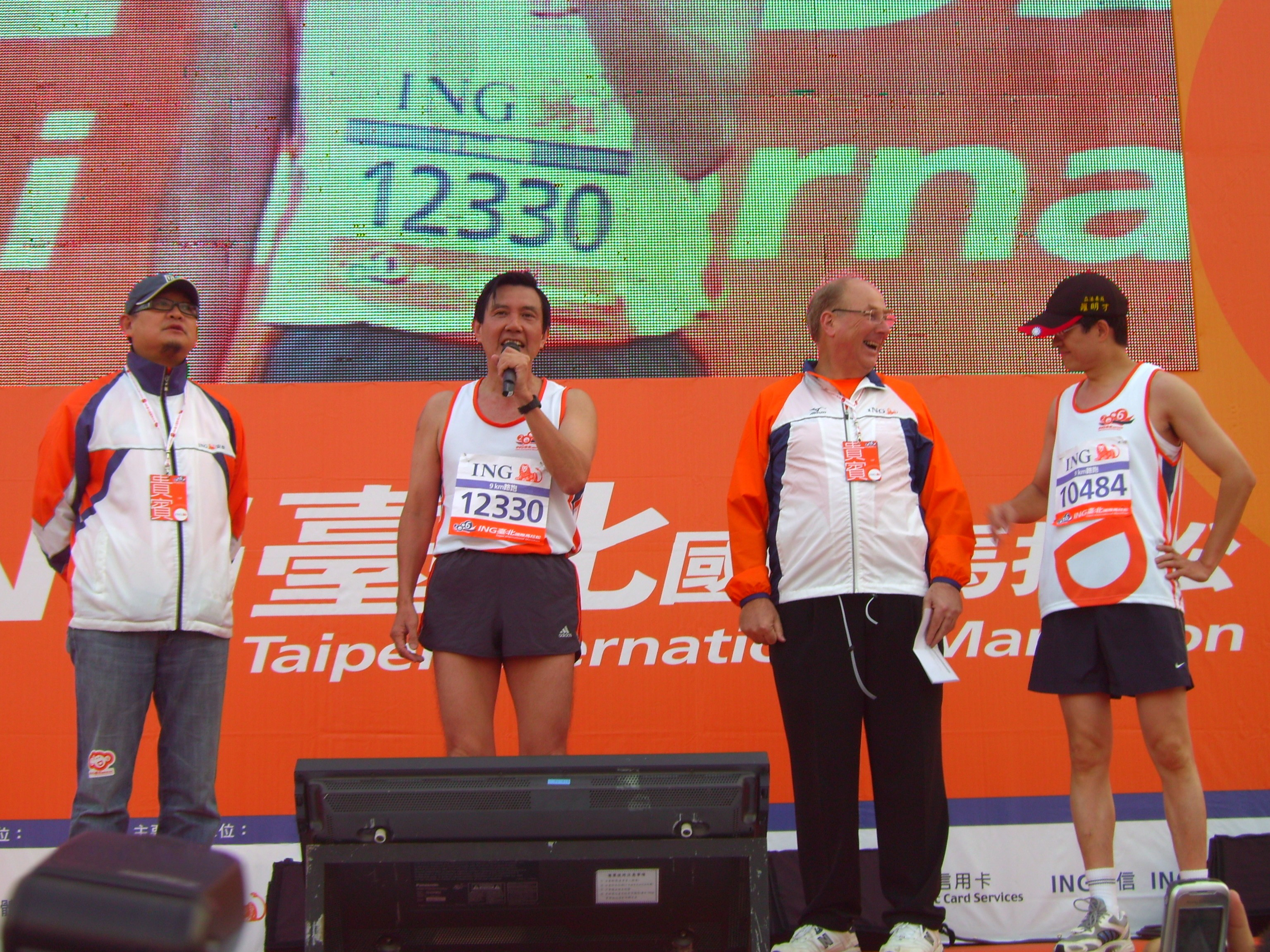
Mayor Ma at the 2006 Taipei Marathon

From 1998 to 2002, Ma's mayoralty of Taipei saw partnerships with private, civil, and media groups to expand and update the city's public transport, utilities, and public buildings, including the construction of six high-speed railways and six highway bridges to lessen traffic congestion. Heavy investments to improve public health, environmental protection, public education, and infrastructure in Taipei contributed to his high popularity in Taipei, which also experienced a decline in corruption. He was elected a member of the standing committee of the KMT in 2001. In December 2002, Ma won reelection for a second mayoral term, defeating DPP nominee Lee Ying-yuan in a landslide, with a 64.1 percent vote majority compared to Lee's 35.8 percent share. He was highly popular among both KMT voters and People First Party voters. Support was strongest for Ma among young and middle-age party voters. His landslide victory over Lee in Taipei made him an emerging KMT candidate for presidential nomination.

Ma was interviewed by Voice of America during a 2006 visit to the United States

During his second term, the slow response of the Taipei government to the 2003 SARS outbreak and a banking scandal that implicated Ma damaged his reputation, although charges against him were dropped in the latter scandal involving Taipei Bank. His popularity rebounded when he criticized the 2004 Taiwanese cross-strait relations referendum, opposed the passing of the PRC's Anti-Secession Law, and supported anti-communist protests in Taiwan commemorating the 1989 Tiananmen Square massacre. He won election to become a vice chairman of the Kuomintang in 2003 and ran in the party's 2005 chairmanship election, defeating Wang Jin-pyng, the president of the Legislative Yuan, with a 72.36 percent majority.

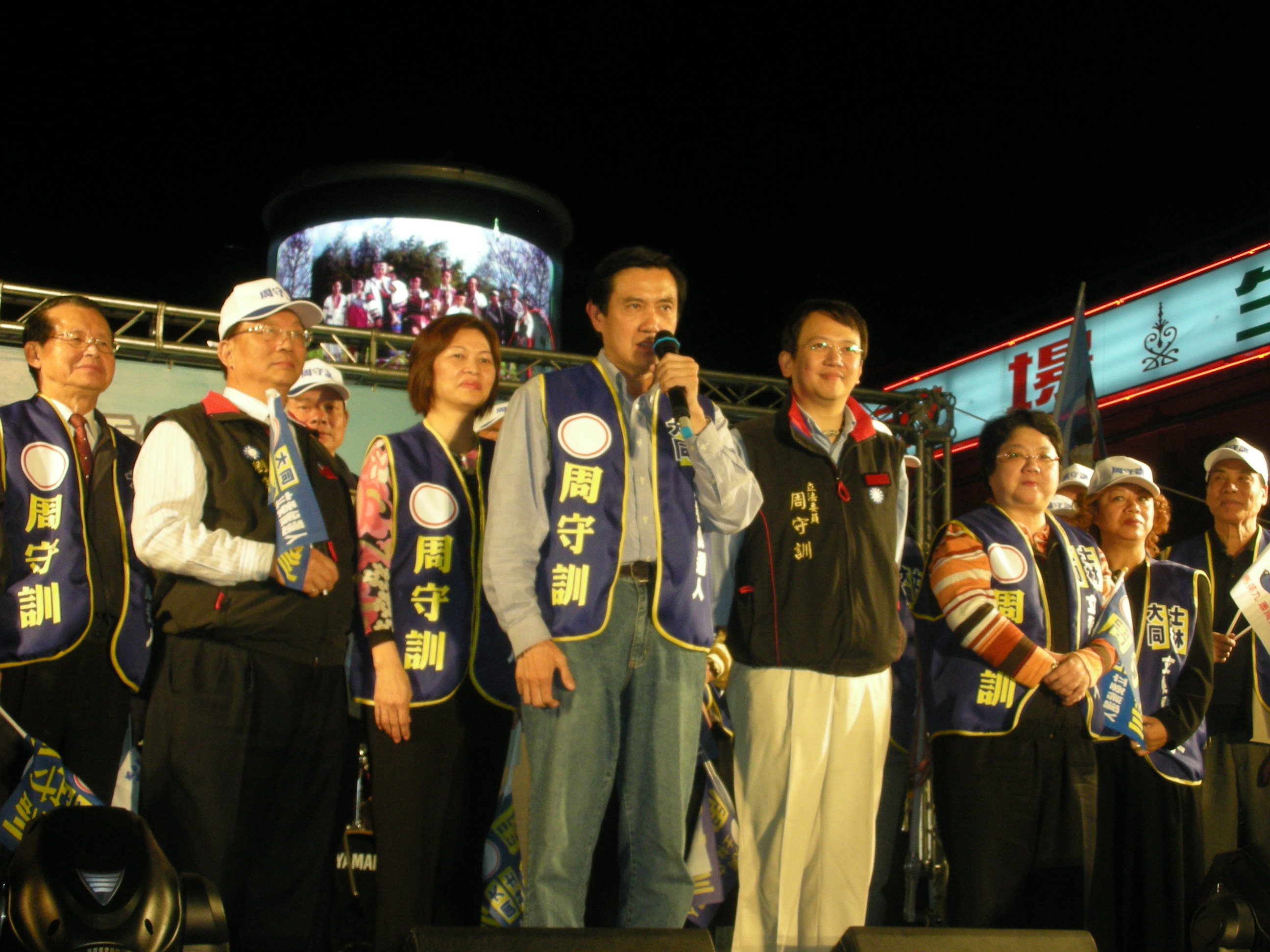
Ma campaigning in 2007 at Shilin Night Market

During his tenure as mayor, Ma was positively viewed for his reputation for incorruptibility. But beginning in September 2006, he was prosecuted on charges of mishandling a US$338,000 special mayoral allowance fund. The case dominated news coverage towards the end of 2006, just as Ma was exiting the mayoralty. The Taipei high court prosecutor's office alleged that he illegally transferred a portion of the funds into a personal account. Ma was indicted by the Taipei prosecutor's office on 12 February 2007. On the same day, he announced his candidacy in the 2008 Taiwanese presidential election. In accordance with party rules which prohibit an indicted person from serving as KMT chairman, Ma resigned from the Kuomintang chairmanship, although party members encouraged him to stay. The case ended on 14 August 2007, when Ma was found not guilty and was cleared of all charges by the Taipei District Court, allowing him to enter the presidential race. (Note: Prosecutors appealed the decision to the Taipei High Court, which again cleared Ma of all charges in December 2007. Prosecutors then appealed again to the Supreme Court of Taiwan, which finally ended the case in April 2008 with Ma still being cleared of all charges.) Throughout the affair, his popularity remained high as a majority of voters believed the charges to be politically motivated.

== 2007–2008 presidential campaign ==
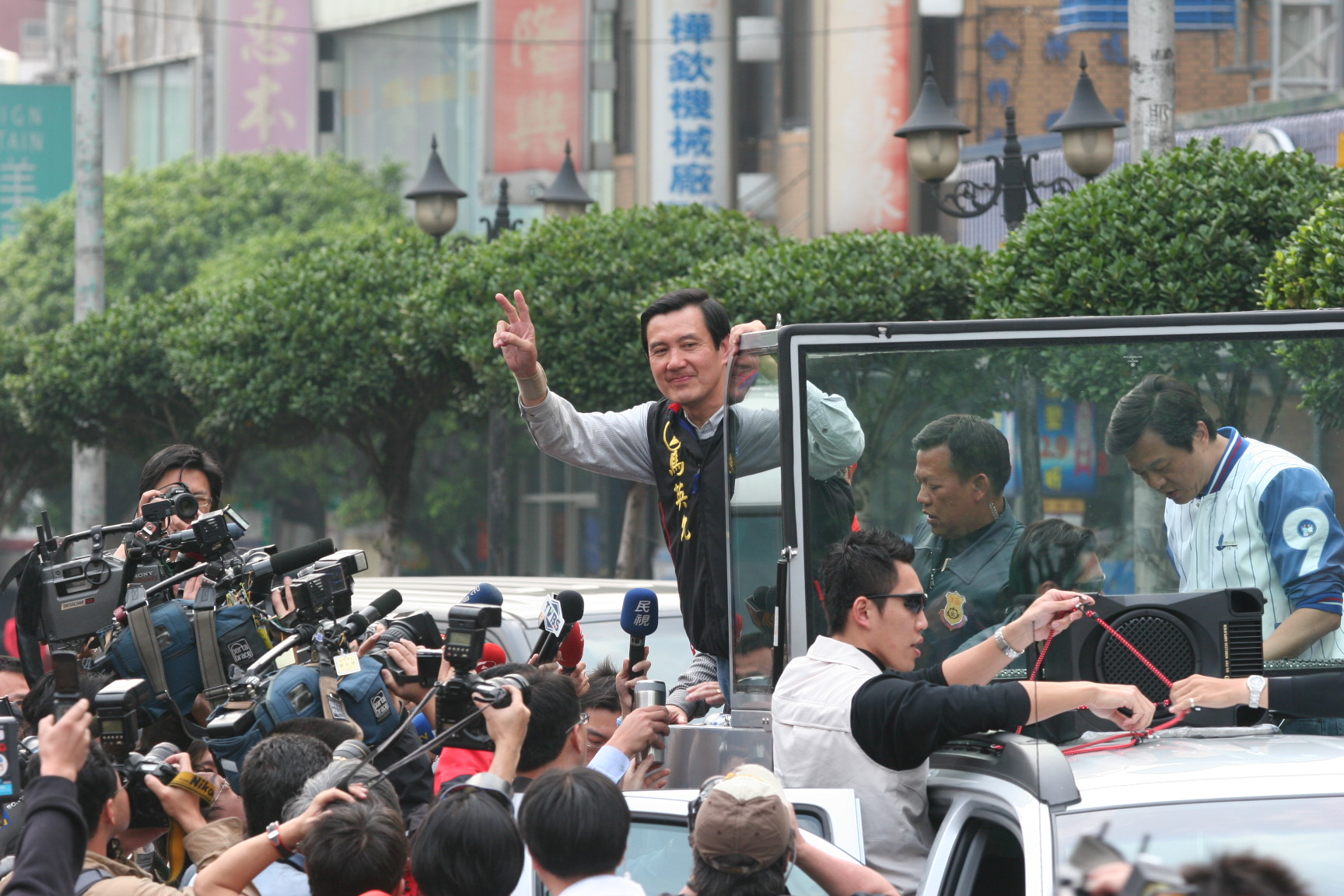
Ma campaigning for president in Taipei, March 2008

On 2 May 2007, Ma was nominated as the Kuomintang's 2008 presidential nominee. He initially considered Wang Jin-pyng, his former opponent in the KMT chairmanship race, as his running mate but, in late May, Wang declined. Instead, Ma announced on 23 June 2007, that he had chosen former premier and economic minister Vincent Siew as his vice-presidential running mate.

Results of the 2008 Taiwanese presidential election

Ma and Siew primarily campaigned on economic and foreign policy issues, including fostering closer relations with mainland China and improving Taiwan's economic situation by increasing cross-strait trade and investment. Ma advocated a "6-3-3 plan" of increasing GDP growth to 6 percent annually, reducing unemployment to 3 percent by implementing 12 infrastructure projects totaling US$130 billion, and increasing the GDP per capita to US$30,000. He and Siew advocated lowering taxes and addressing wage stagnation, inflation, and economic inequality. In foreign policy, Ma advocated "New Three Noes": no formal independence, no unification, and no use of force. Their DPP opponents were former premiers Frank Hsieh—a pragmatist in dealing with cross-strait relations—and Su Tseng-chang. Both Hsieh and Ma were adherents to keeping the status quo between China and Taiwan, with Ma more willing to communicate with Beijing officials.

On 22 March 2008 (election day), Ma defeated Hsieh in a landslide victory. Out of 13,221,609 votes cast (a voter turnout of 76.33 percent), Ma received a clear majority of 7,658,724 votes (58.45 percent) compared to Hsieh's 5,445,239 (41.55 percent), the most votes received by any presidential candidate in Taiwanese history. The Ma-Siew ticket flipped multiple traditionally DPP electoral districts, including Kaohsiung City (where Hsieh had been mayor) and Tainan City (near the birthplace of Chen Shui-bian). Districts with large Hakka and aboriginal Taiwanese populations showed the highest levels of support for Ma. The result of the presidential election marked an end to eight years of DPP control in the presidency, returning it to the KMT.

== Presidency (2008–2016) ==
External videos
- Ma Ying-jeou is sworn in as new Taiwanese president by Associated Press (AP), 20 May 2008
- Ma Ying-jeou sworn in as Taiwanese president, speech, foreign delegs by AP, 20 May 2008

Ma was inaugurated as president on 20 May 2008, and sworn into office by Lai In-jaw, the acting head of the Judicial Yuan, with former president Chen Shui-bian in attendance. Ma's inauguration speech repeated his promises to establish closer economic and diplomatic ties with mainland China without unification. That same month, Time magazine listed Ma as one of the 100 most influential people in the world. He won another landslide in the KMT chairmanship election in July for a second term as chair, winning with over 90 percent of the vote in July 2009 as the sole candidate. He was inaugurated as chairman on 17 October 2009.

=== 2012 presidential election ===
Eligible for a second term, Ma ran for reelection as president in 2012. After incumbent Vice President Vincent Siew announced his retirement and decision not to seek a second term, Premier Wu Den-yih was chosen to replace Siew on the KMT's 2012 ticket. Ma was re-elected president with 51.6% of the vote, defeating Democratic Progressive Party chairwoman Tsai Ing-wen. The ruling party also retained its majority in the legislative elections held on the same day.

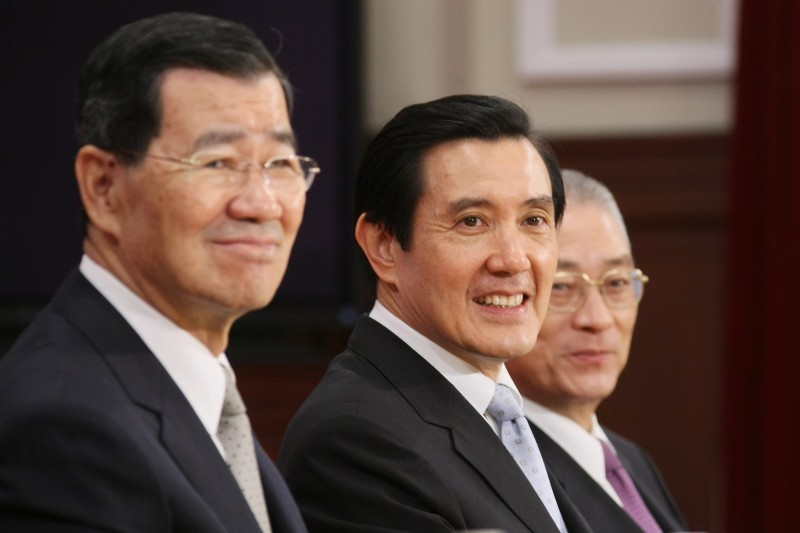
President Ma with Vice President Vincent Siew (left) and Premier Wu Den-yih (right)

=== Cross-strait relations ===
After his success in the presidential election, Ma Ying-jeou said he had no immediate plans to visit mainland China and would work to fulfill his campaign pledge to improve relations with mainland China. He proposed a policy of "Flexible Diplomacy" in foreign affairs. Instead of confronting the PRC in every international encounter, Ma aimed to build a certain degree of mutual trust across the Taiwan Strait, which could later be extended to the international stage. In August 2008, Ma undertook his first foreign trip as president, focusing on strengthening relations with Taiwan's Latin American allies. In 2009, Taiwan received an invitation from the World Health Organization (WHO) to attend the annual World Health Assembly (WHA) meeting as an observer under the name "Chinese Taipei."

Based on the 1992 Consensus, semi-official cross-strait talks between the Straits Exchange Foundation (SEF) and its Chinese counterpart, the Association for Relations Across the Taiwan Straits (ARATS), resumed in June 2008. Ma launched direct weekend cross-strait charter flights, opened Taiwan to mainland Chinese tourists, eased restrictions on Taiwanese investment in mainland China and approved measures allowing mainland Chinese investors to buy Taiwan stocks. The Time magazine noted that in less than three months, "relations between Taiwan and China have arguably seen the most rapid advancement in the six-decade standoff between the two governments."

After the second Chen–Chiang summit, Taiwan and mainland China resumed direct sea, air, and mail links on 15 December 2008, ending an almost six-decade-long ban between the two sides on such trips. As many as 108 flights per week as well as 60 cargo flights per month were scheduled, evenly divided between Taiwanese and mainland Chinese airlines. Shipping companies, due to shorter voyages and time savings, are able to save up to US$120 million (TWD $4 billion) each year. The two sides also agreed that neither the ROC nor the PRC flag will be displayed when a ship enters port. In July 2009, Ma rejected the proposal to open the airspace of the Taiwan Strait to accommodate higher passenger traffic, citing that the Taiwan Strait airspace is important to Taiwanese security.

A free trade agreement with China was signed in 2010 called the Economic Cooperation Framework Agreement (ECFA), which was accompanied by a debate and protests. Ma attempted to pass the Cross-Strait Service Trade Agreement in his second term, building on the ECFA. This sparked the Sunflower Student Movement, initiated by a coalition of students and civic groups in the Legislative Yuan and later also the Executive Yuan.

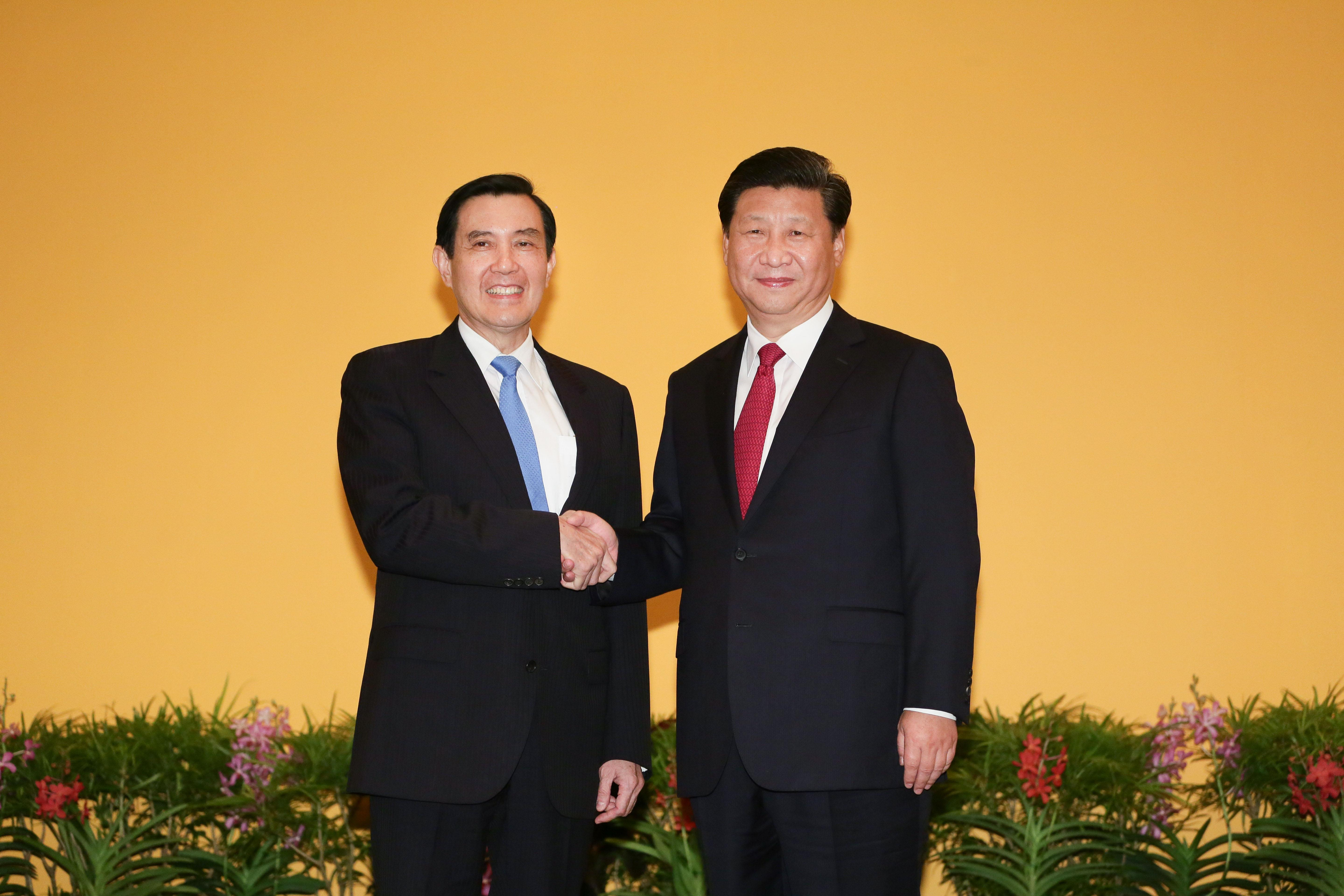
Ma Ying-jeou meeting with Mainland top leader Xi Jinping in November 2015, in their respective capacity as the leader of Taiwan and mainland China.

On 7 November 2015, Ma met and shook hands with the Chinese Communist Party General Secretary Xi Jinping in Singapore within their capacity as Leader of Taiwan and Leader of mainland China respectively. The meeting marked the first ever meeting between leaders of both sides since the end of Chinese Civil War in 1949. Both leaders addressed each other using the honorific xiānshēng (Chinese: 先生, "Mister").

=== Domestic policy ===
==== Economy ====
One of Ma's promises as presidential candidate was called the "633 Plan", which promised economic growth rate of 6%, unemployment rate of less than 3%, and per capita income of more than US$30,000. However, the Great Recession around the world caused about 2,000 companies in Taiwan to go bankrupt in the six months following Ma's inauguration, according to a governmental commercial office in Taipei. At the time, the high unemployment rate (~4.06% in July) and consumer price index three months after Ma's inauguration were unprecedented, having not been seen in 28 years. The Taiwan Stock Exchange also fell to two-year lows in September 2008. The Financial Times describes Taiwan's economic downturn as results from "downward pressure driven by global factors". Analysts also point out that, "during its first 100 days in office, the government has made a series of bold steps to deregulate economic cross-strait ties. But as these policies coincided with the global downturn and foreign investors had already bought Taiwan stocks heavily before the election, betting on the reforms, the island's market has seen a sell-off worse than the regional average."

On 11 September 2008, Ma's cabinet unveiled a $5.6-billion USD ($180-billion TWD) economic stimulus package. Among the items of the package were infrastructure projects, economic incentives to small businesses, and other tax cuts. Stock transaction taxes were also halved for the next six months. Taiwan's government reported that the economy shrank by 1% in the third quarter and further contracted 8.36% in the last quarter of 2008. Although growth resumed in the fourth quarter of 2009, the economy still shrank by 1.87% for the year. In 2010, Taiwan's economy rebounded strongly, expanding by 10%.

==== Disaster response ====
Typhoon Morakot, the worst typhoon to strike Taiwan in fifty years, hit Taiwan on 8 August 2009. In the storm's aftermath, President Ma was criticized for his handling of the disaster by both sides of Taiwan's political spectrum. Many news outlets likened Typhoon Morakot to being Ma's "Hurricane Katrina." Multiple opinion polls in Taiwan showed a sharp double-digit drop in Ma's approval rating, with figures falling to between 16% and 29%.

Following pressure from the opposition, Ma took steps to publicly apologize for his government's failure to respond swiftly with rescue and recovery efforts. Ma canceled the 2009 National Day celebrations and his state visit to the Solomon Islands for the Third Taiwan-South Pacific summit. Premier Liu Chao-shiuan, Defense Minister Chen Chao-min, and Vice Foreign Minister Andrew Hsia all tendered their resignations. Wu Den-yih was appointed as the new premier, and the cabinet underwent a reshuffle.

==== Party politics ====
In September 2013, President Ma accused Speaker Wang Jin-pyng of influence peddling, resulting in a power struggle. Following the KMT's unprecedented loss in the 2014 local elections, Ma resigned as KMT chairman. The KMT lost its majority in the Legislative Yuan during the final period of Ma's presidency, and Ma eventually handed over power to opposition leader Tsai Ing-wen in 2016.

== Post-presidency ==
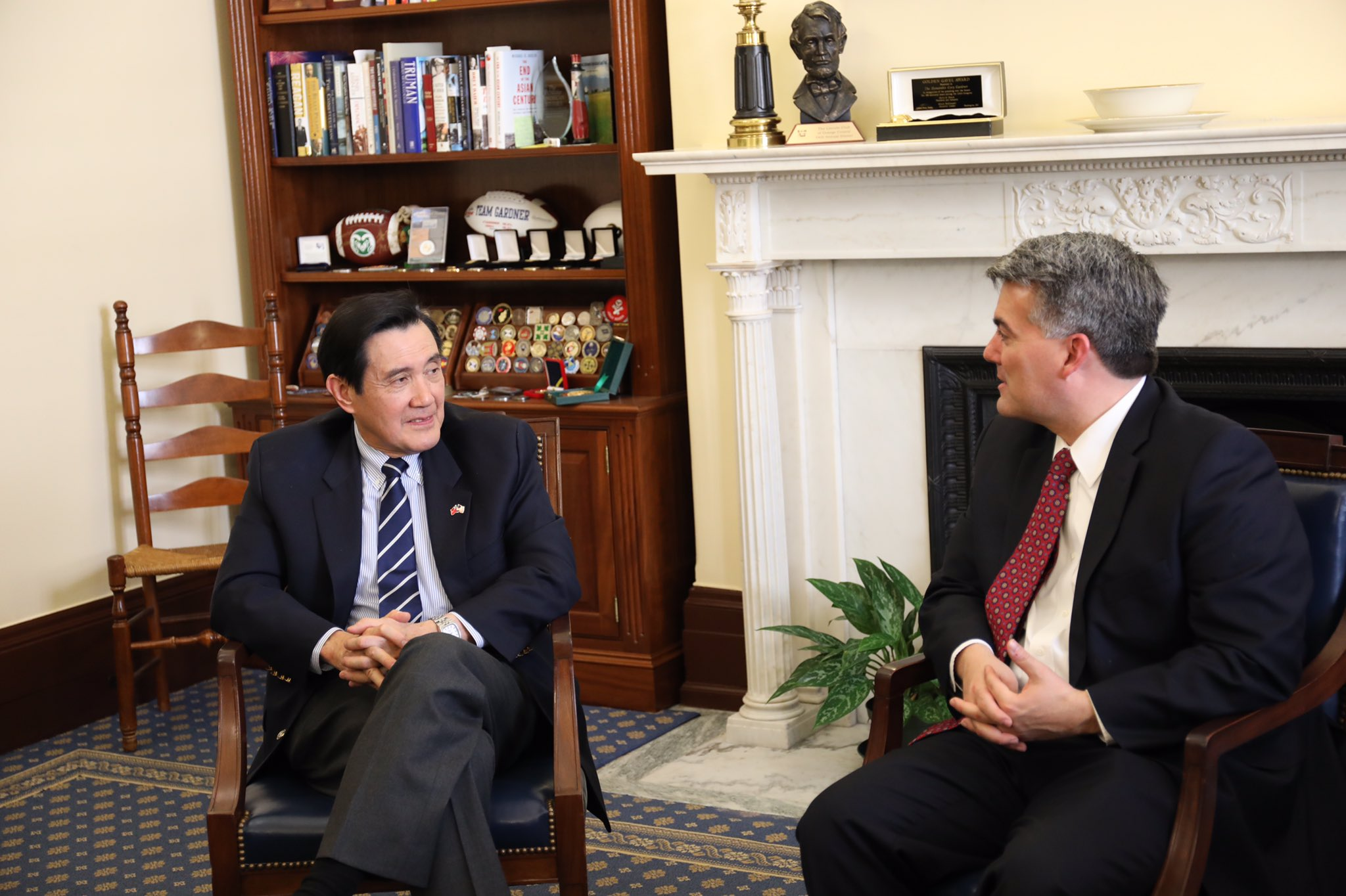
Ma meeting with U.S. Senator Cory Gardner during his 2017 visit to the United States

On 1 June 2016, it was announced that Ma planned to visit Hong Kong on 15 June to attend the 2016 Award for Editorial Excellence dinner at the Hong Kong Convention and Exhibition Centre and would deliver a speech on cross-strait relations and East Asia. The Tsai Ing-wen administration blocked Ma from traveling to Hong Kong, and he gave prepared remarks via teleconference instead.

In August 2016, Soochow University confirmed that Ma had rejoined the faculty as a lecturer. On 26 September 2016, Ma gave his first lecture which was about the history of Taiwan. Yet, as a chair professor of law, Ma was protested by students at Soochow University to ask for his resignation since he has repeatedly issued controversial legal opinions. In November 2016, Ma attended the World Chinese Economic Summit in Malacca, Malaysia, where he also served as one of the speakers. It was his first overseas visit since leaving office. Since 2016, Ma has made multiple visits to the United States, during which he delivered speeches at academic institutions and policy forums.

In Taiwanese politics, Ma established the Ma Ying-jeou Foundation, named after himself, and personally served as its chairman in 2018. The foundation aims to identify the right path for the nation and to help young people find direction for their future. He served as a witness during the negotiations between the Kuomintang (KMT) and the Taiwan People's Party (TPP) to form a joint presidential ticket for the 2024 election; however, the talks ultimately collapsed without an agreement.

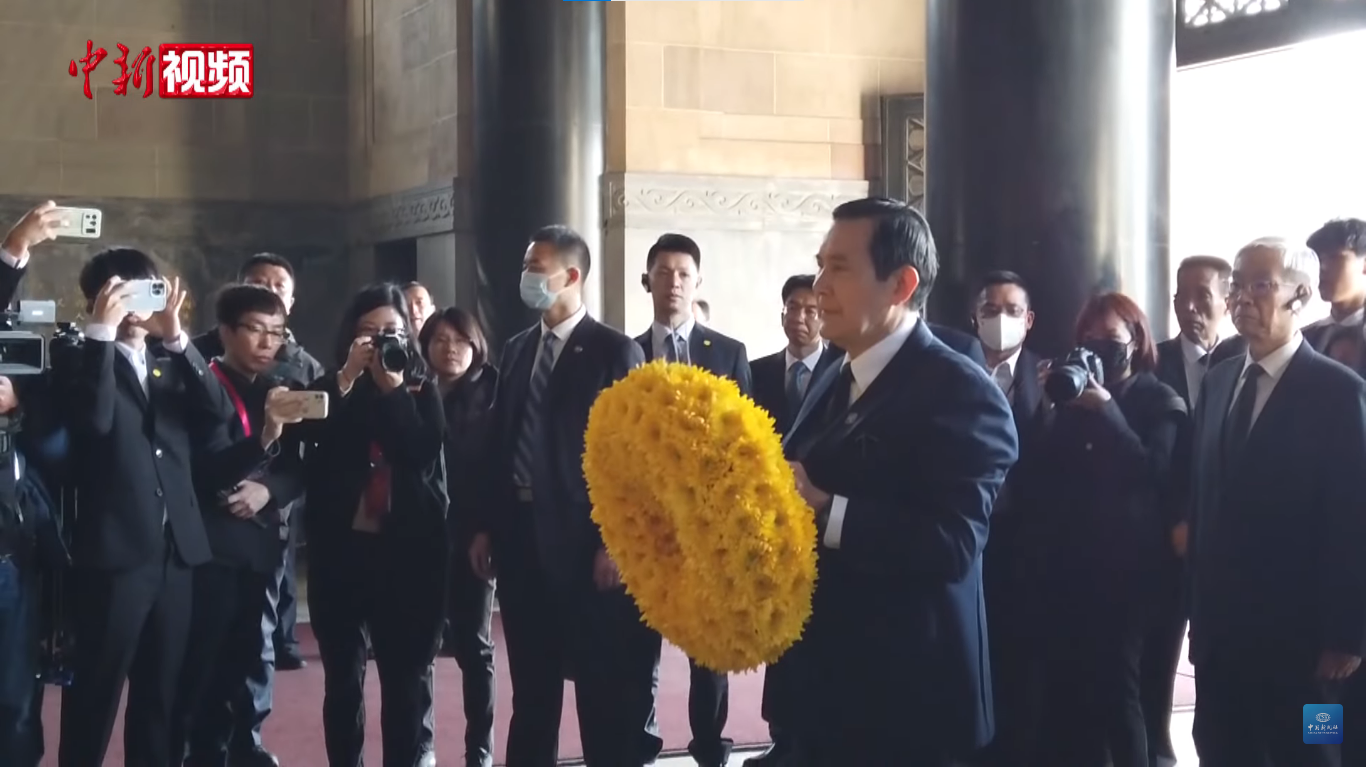
Ma paying respects at the Sun Yat-sen Mausoleum in Nanjing, March 2023

In 2023, Ma became the first former ROC leader to visit mainland China since the civil war of 1949, with a trip slated for 27 March to 7 April, pledging peace between the two countries. The trip came amidst rising tension between mainland China and Taiwan. Ma visited China twice in 2024, during which he met with Chinese leader Xi Jinping. In June 2025, he visited mainland China again to attend the annual Straits Forum in Xiamen, Fujian. He met with Wang Huning, the deputy leader of the Central Leading Group for Taiwan Affairs and the Chairman of the Chinese People's Political Consultative Conference.

== Political positions ==
=== View on Chinese unification ===
In a December 2005 Newsweek International interview, when asked about unification, Ma stated that "for our party, the eventual goal is reunification, but we don't have a timetable."

In February 2006, Ma published an op-ed in The Wall Street Journal titled Taiwan's 'Pragmatic Path'. In the article, Ma stated that neither unification nor independence was likely for Taiwan in the foreseeable future and that the status quo should be maintained. He emphasized that the island's future should be determined by its people, rather than the government. During the same month, while visiting Europe, the KMT ran an advertisement in the Liberty Times with the same title, asserting that Taiwan's future could take many possible directions—be it unification, independence, or maintaining the status quo—and that such decisions must be made by the people. The advertisement, which stated that independence is an option for the people of Taiwan, sparked criticism within the party and raised concerns in the PRC. Wang Jin-pyng felt gratified for the policy shift, since Wang himself made a similar statement during the 2004 election, but James Soong said he was "shocked" and Lien Chan said he was never consulted. Ma clarified later that the KMT policy of retaining the status quo has not changed and has reiterated this position several times; further, he has also reiterated his party's support of the one-China policy.

Ma supported autonomy for Tibet. On 17 March 2008, Ma threatened to boycott the Beijing Olympics if elected, should the Tibetan unrest spiral out of control. After he was elected president, he refused to let the Dalai Lama visit Taiwan, citing the timing as inappropriate. He later approved a visit by the Dalai Lama to lead prayers for Typhoon Morakot victims in August 2009.

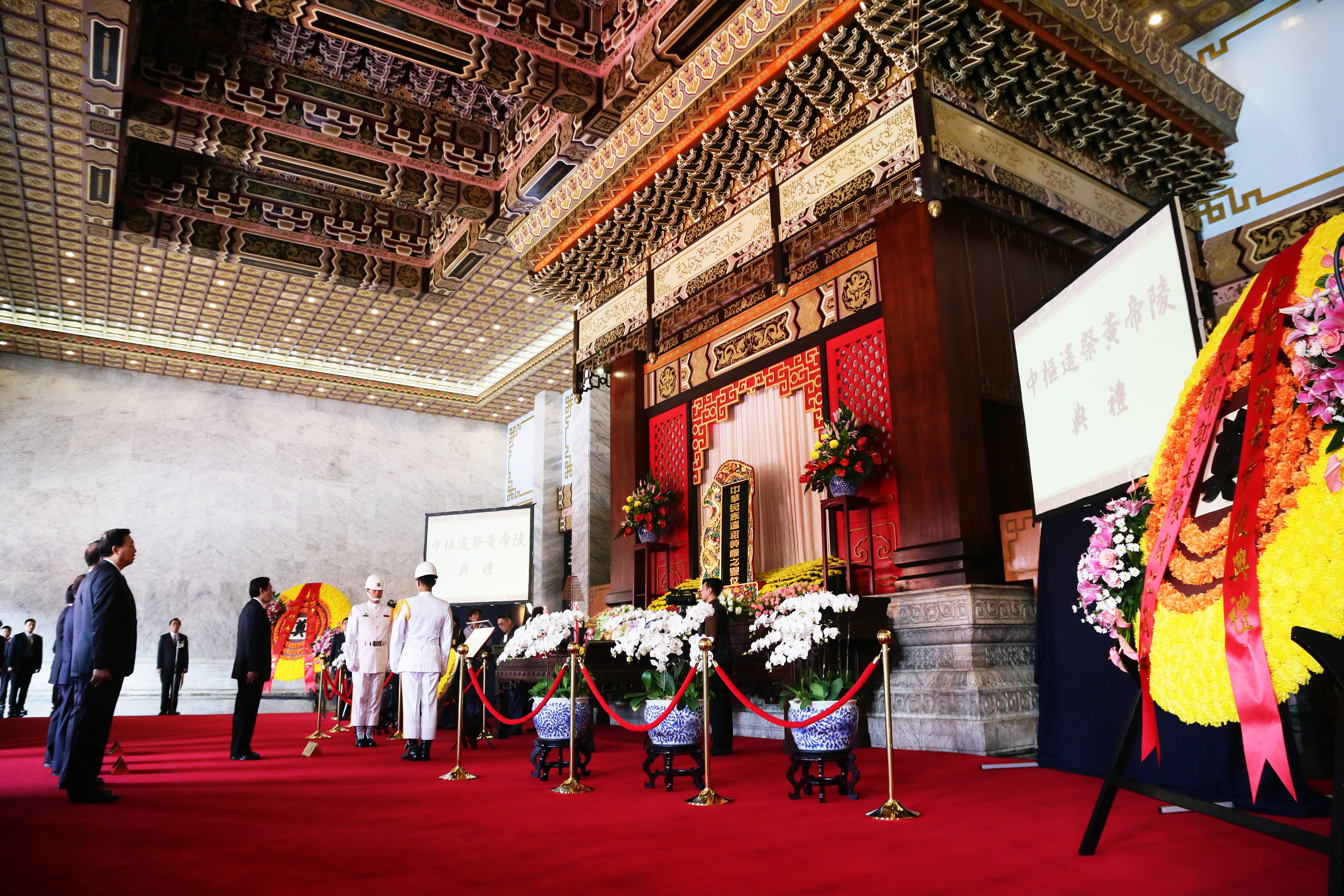
President Ma Ying-jeou paying homage to the Yellow Emperor in 2015

In April 2009, President Ma became the first ROC president to pay homage in person to the legendary Yellow Emperor who is believed to have founded China as a nation approximately 5,000 years ago. Accompanied by all his government leaders, the president sang the ROC's national anthem as the starter. Ma's spokesman said the president wanted to pay his respects to the Yellow Emperor on National Tomb-Sweeping Day in person to stress the importance of the Chinese ancestor-worshipping tradition. However, others saw the precedent-making ceremonies at the Martyrs' Shrine as meant to be a show by President Ma of his unprofessed commitment to maintain a close relationship between Taiwan and mainland China. During his time at the tomb of the Yellow Emperor, Ma said that most Taiwanese people have a strong belief in Chinese culture and national identity.

In June 2025, Ma told United Daily News that his position is that "the two sides of the strait should pursue peaceful and democratic unification". He also said unification should not be achieved with "the use or threat of force and must "respect the will of the people of Taiwan".

=== Cross-strait relations ===
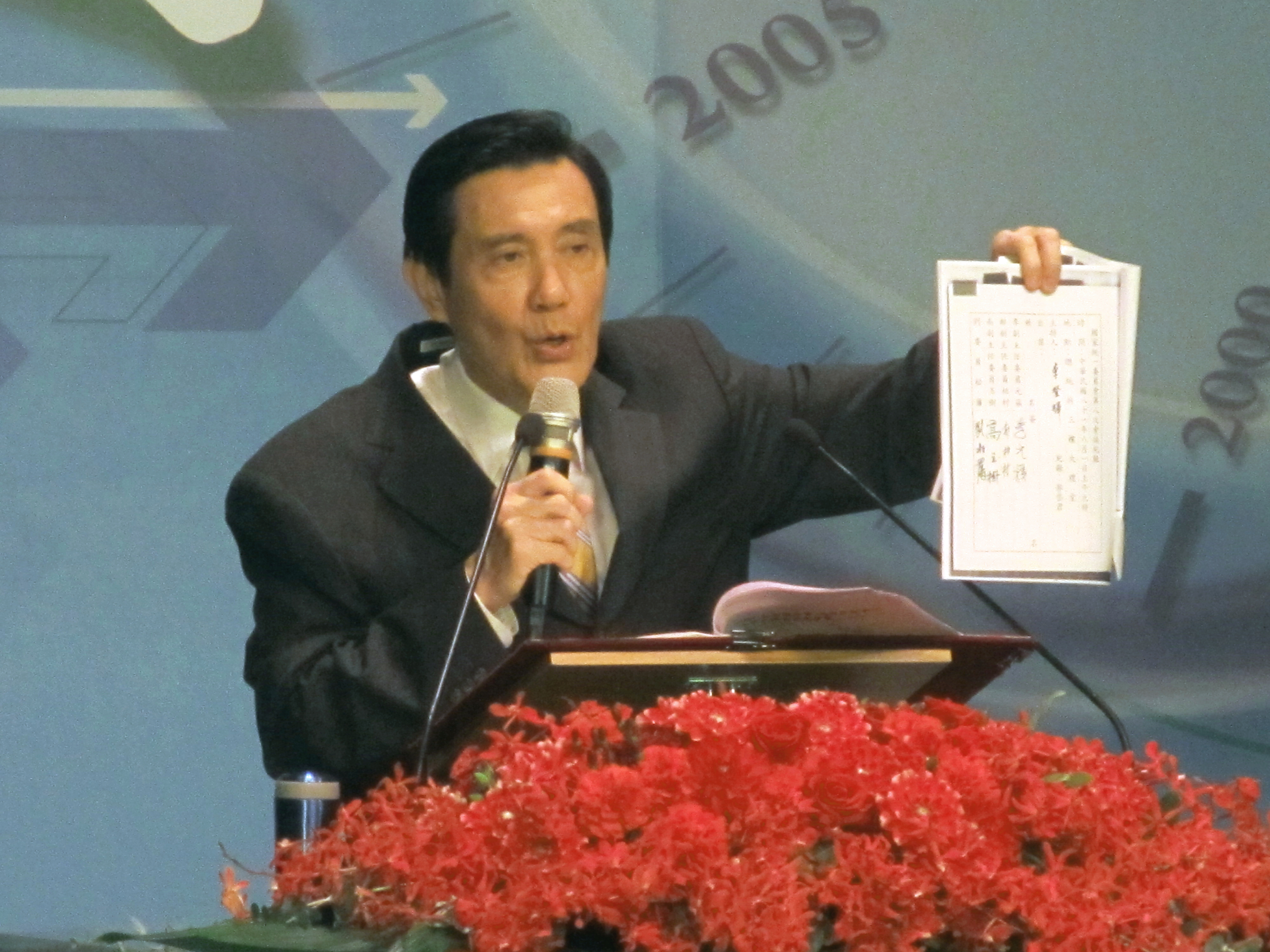
Ma Ying-jeou emphasizing the existence of the 1992 Consensus

Ma Ying-jeou has emphasized the "1992 Consensus" as the existing basis for constructive dialogue and exchange between mainland China and Taiwan. On 2 September 2008, Ma declared that the relations between Taiwan and mainland China were a "special relationship not between two nations", but one that can be handled invoking the 1992 Consensus between the two sides. While the governing authorities on mainland China and Taiwan cannot recognise each other as a legitimate government due to legal and constitutional reasons, Ma seeks that they would refrain from denying the other side being the de facto governing authority of one area of the state. In 2012, he mentioned the "one country, two areas", maintaining that mainland China and Taiwan both belong the Republic of China and that the relationship between the two sides is a special region-to-region relationship.

However, there were also times when Ma declared Taiwan and mainland China to be separate countries. In March 2006, Ma told his audience in New York that Taiwan was already a sovereign, independent nation, given that it elected its own president and administered its own affairs. He therefore concluded that Taiwan did not need to declare independence. When interviewed by CNN on 30 April 2010, Ma repeated this opinion, "The Republic of China on Taiwan has been an independent sovereign state for 99 years. There is no reason to declare independence twice." During the televised presidential debate on 3 December 2011, he said, "Taiwan is our home, and the Republic of China is our country," then paused and added, "Taiwan is also our country." At the subsequent press conference, he regarded the Republic of China as the official name of a country and Taiwan as its common name. During a public conversation with Jerome A. Cohen in New York (March 2017), after being asked about Taiwan independence, Ma also said, "Have you ever heard of a country declaring independence twice? We were an independent country back in 1912 – how can I declare independence again?"

In 2006, Ma Ying-jeou proposed the "Five Noes" to maintain the status quo, which largely reiterated the content of Chen Shui-bian's "Four Noes and One Without." During a visit to the United States in March 2006, Ma further articulated a proactive strategy for cross-strait relations, termed the "Five Do's." These initiatives included: resuming cross-strait dialogue based on the 1992 Consensus; signing a peace agreement and establishing a mechanism for mutual military trust; creating a joint cross-strait market; enhancing Taiwan's participation in the international community; and strengthening cultural and educational exchanges.

Ma consistently expressed concern over the 1989 Tiananmen Square protests and massacre and supported democratization in China. However, prior to the 20th anniversary, he postponed and eventually canceled a scheduled meeting with Wang Dan, a former student leader of the 1989 protests. Ma also received criticism from the opposition Democratic Progressive Party for allegedly praising the PRC on human rights during the anniversary commemorations.

Ma voiced support for the acceptance of simplified Chinese for written text and the continued use of traditional Chinese for printed text. Ma had to clarify his remarks regarding simplified characters at a 15-minute speech before the sixth International Conference on Internet Chinese Education on 19 June 2009. Ma reiterated his policy of urging the Chinese to learn the traditional system; his previous call was for the ability of Taiwan's population to recognize simplified characters and not for simplified characters to supplant the traditional system in Taiwan. In a 2004 speech hosted by Microsoft Taiwan, he had proposed for traditional characters (繁體字; literally: complicated characters) to be instead called 'orthodox characters' (正體字) (then the translation 'traditional Chinese characters' would be more appropriate as well). Ma advocated the use of Hanyu Pinyin, developed in the PRC, and made it the official romanization system in Taiwan in 2009.

=== East China Sea and South China Sea ===
Ma Ying-jeou supports the Republic of China's sovereignty over the Senkaku Islands and opposes their inclusion under the U.S.-Japan Security Treaty. In 2012, he proposed the "East China Sea Peace Initiative," urging all parties to exercise restraint, resolve disputes peacefully, and jointly develop resources in the region. In 2014, Ma received the Eisenhower Medallion from People to People International for his efforts in the initiative.

In 2015, Ma introduced the "South China Sea Peace Initiative," advocating for the peaceful resolution of disputes and the joint development of resources in the South China Sea. The following year, he visited Taiping Island to reaffirm the ROC's sovereignty over the territory and its status as an island.

== Personal life ==
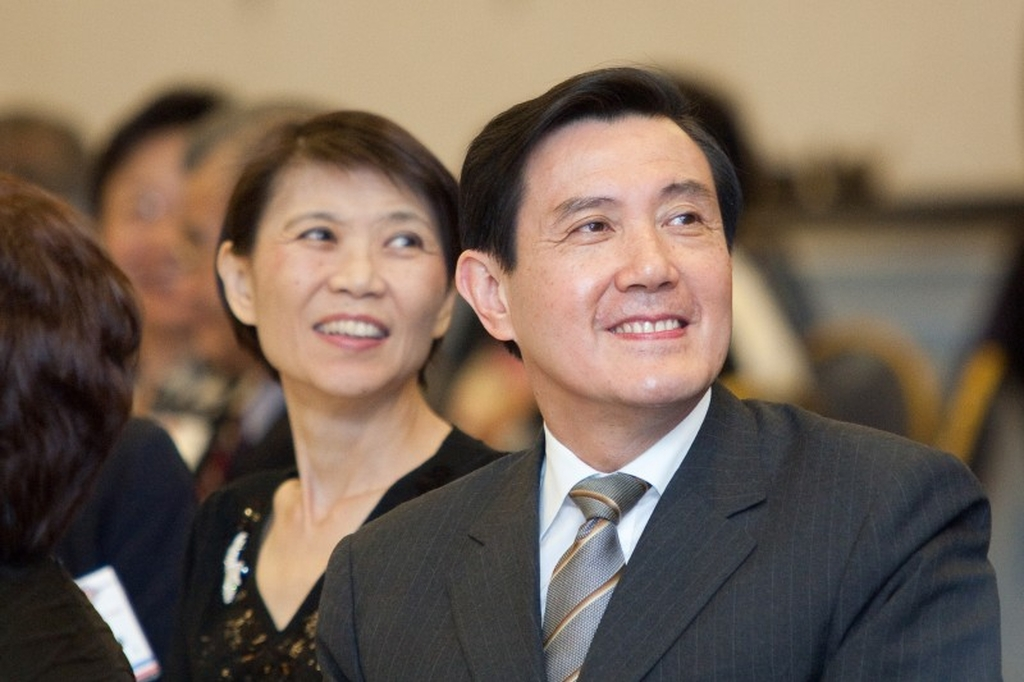
President Ma and his wife, Chow Mei-ching, during an overseas visit in 2009

Ma married Christine Mei-ching Chow, a classmate of his sister at New York University, in 1977. The couple has two daughters: Lesley and Yuan-chung. Lesley (Ma Wei-chung, Chinese: 馬唯中) was born in 1981 in New York City while Ma was attending Harvard. She completed her undergraduate studies in life sciences at Harvard University and then her graduate studies at New York University. Ma's youngest daughter, Ma Yuan-chung, was born in Taiwan and completed her master's degree at the London School of Economics and earned a doctorate from Nanyang Technological University.

Ma and his wife sponsor children of low-income families in El Salvador through World Vision International. On an official trip to Central America in June 2009, Mrs. Ma was able to meet with one of her sponsored children, an 11-year-old boy in San Salvador.

Ma is the uncle of Gene Yu, an American, former United States Army Special Forces captain and the author of the Yellow Green Beret: Stories of an Asian-American Stumbling Around U.S. Army Special Forces series of books.

Ma speaks Taiwanese Hokkien, Hakka and Hunanese (his ancestral native dialects), Mandarin (the national language) as well as English fluently.

== Honours ==
- Belize:
  - Order of Belize
- Burkina Faso:
  - Grand Cross of the Ordre de l'Étalon, formerly National Order of Burkina Faso (2012)
- Dominican Republic:
  - Grand Cross with Gold Breast Star of the Order of Merit of Duarte, Sánchez and Mella (2015)
- El Salvador:
  - Grand Cross with Gold Star of the National Order of Doctor José Matías Delgado (2014)
- Eswatini:
  - Collar of the Royal Order of the Crown (2012)
- Gambia:
  - Honorary Grand Commander of the Order of the Republic of The Gambia (2012)
- Guatemala:
  - Grand Collar of the Order of the Quetzal
- Haiti:
  - Grand Cross of the National Order of Honour and Merit (2014)
- Marshall Islands:
  - Traditional Paramount Leader Medal (2013)
- Saint Kitts and Nevis:
  - Collar of the Order of St Christopher and Nevis (2011)
- SMOM:
  - Collar pro Merito Melitensi (2015)

== See also ==
- Politics of the Republic of China

== Notes ==
Political offices
Preceded by Wei Yung	Minister of Research, Development and Evaluation; 1988–1991	Succeeded by Sun Te-hsiung
Preceded by Lu Yu-wen	Minister of Justice; 1993–1996	Succeeded by Liao Cheng-hao
Preceded by Chen Shui-bian	Mayor of Taipei; 1998–2006	Succeeded by Hau Lung-pin
Preceded by Chen Shui-bian	President of the Republic of China; 2008–2016	Succeeded by Tsai Ing-wen
Party political offices
Preceded by Lien Chan	Chairman of the Kuomintang; 2005–2007	Succeeded by Wu Po-hsiung
Preceded by Lien Chan	Kuomintang nominee for President of the Republic of China; 2008, 2012	Succeeded by Eric Chu
Preceded by Wu Po-hsiung	Chairman of the Kuomintang; 2009–2014	Succeeded by Wu Den-yih; Acting
