= Gene Yu =

American writer

- Born: 26 October 1979 (age 46); Concord, Massachusetts, U.S.
- Military career
- Allegiance: United States
- Branch: United States Army
- Service years: 1997 – 2009
- Rank: Captain
- Unit: Special Forces
- Other work: Private military security financial advisory technology sports apparel entertainment

Gene Yu (Chinese: 余靖; born October 26, 1979) is an American author and former U.S. Army Special Forces officer. He wrote the book Yellow Green Beret: Stories of an Asian-American Stumbling Around U.S. Army Special Forces (series)|Yellow Green Beret: Stories of an Asian-American Stumbling Around U.S. Army Special Forces Vols. 1 to 3, under the pen name of Chester Wong, a semi-autobiographical and comedic take on his time in the Green Berets.

He is also the nephew of Taiwanese President Ma Ying-jeou and was instrumental in the negotiation and release of Taiwanese citizen Evelyn Chang (Chang An-wei), from Abu Sayyaf militants in the Philippines.

== Background and education ==
Gene Yu was born in Concord, Massachusetts on October 26, 1979 and moved to Northern California in 1988, where he grew up. He is of Hakka ancestry. Yu's mother is the younger sister of Taiwanese President Ma Ying-jeou. Although he is the nephew of President Ma, he had little contact with him while growing up.

Yu matriculated into West Point at 17 and received his commission in June 2001. His first command was as a tank platoon and mortar platoon leader along the demilitarized zone in South Korea. He joined the Special Forces in 2006.

During the final stages of his U.S. Army Special Forces Qualification Course in December 2005, Yu was in the Survival, Evasion, Resistance and Escape (SERE) phase of the program. In accordance with the requirements of the training, Yu only carried his military ID card and a knife. Yu and his classmates were also expected to learn to live off the land, and as such, ate very little. In the final days of the evasion portion of the school and motivated by hunger, Yu left the boundaries of the exercise and came upon a group of Guatemalans in the North Carolina forest. Using Spanish skills acquired during extensive foreign travel, Yu was able to convince them to give him a ride to the nearby town of Aberdeen. After reaching Aberdeen and being rejected by a convenience store when he tried to pay using his ID and memorized credit card number, Yu directed the group to a Papa John's Pizza's location and ordered pizzas and other food, knowing he could pay with his ID and without an actual physical credit card, as he had done in the past at other Papa John’s restaurants. Yu returned to his classmates with the food. Though they destroyed the evidence of the pizzas, Yu was later found with the receipt during the resistance phase of the school during a strip search that was part of the training. Yu was initially forced out of the U.S. Army Special Forces Qualification Course, despite only being short one day of graduation, but was later able to repeat the class and receive his Green Beret. While some saw the incident as a typically creative Special Forces-type of solution to the SERE challenge, his story is still reportedly told as a cautionary tale to incoming students to the SERE program by its cadre (albeit without Yu’s name and with the consequence of having been being forced out of the school).

During his time in the U.S. Army, he also served in Iraq, the Philippines, and Okinawa. Due to the classified nature of his assignments there is little information about his deployments on public record.

During his tours of duty, Yu conducted hostage rescue missions in Baghdad and coordinated 5,000 Filipino marines and soldiers in an attack on an Abu Sayyaf base.

Yu served 8 years in the military (4 years additionally at West Point) and was awarded with two Bronze Stars and was discharged with rank of captain, although he was selected for early promotion to major.

== The Chang An-wei incident ==
While on vacation, Taiwanese citizen Chang An-Wei was abducted by Abu Sayyaf gunmen on the Malaysian island of Pom Pom and was taken to the Philippines on November 15, 2013. Her husband, Hsu Li-Min, was killed.

While visiting Taiwan to promote the Chinese language edition of Yellow Green Beret, Yu learned about the kidnapping. He described his relationship with Chang as "a family friend." On the request of the Chang family, Yu went to the Philippines and utilizing his contacts within the Filipino armed forces and through a network of private security contractors, he organized two task forces to find Chang.

Though the Filipino armed forces attempted to stop their soldiers and marines from taking part in the operation, they continued to work with Yu. One of Yu’s former instructors from West Point and fellow Green Beret officer also introduced him to Filipino special operations officers.

Yu's team also opened a line of communication to the militants with regards to their ransom demands. Initially, the Abu Sayyaf group that held Chang asked for millions of dollars, but their monetary demands fluctuated wildly throughout their discussions. Ten days before Chang regained her freedom, Yu posed as a Chinese-speaking doctor during a phone call to the militants. The militants abruptly cut negotiations with the suspicion that Yu was a Taiwanese spy and threatened to kill Evelyn Chang, but two days later, Yu’s team was able to re-open communications under the guise of being a different group of negotiators.

Chang was sold to various subgroups within the Abu Sayyaf organization, complicating the efforts to find her and the ongoing negotiations. Following the conversation Yu had with Chang, he and his team became concerned that she would be moved further up the Abu Sayyaf organization and that action on their part was required. The Filipino members of his team received orders from their chain of command to not get involved. The orders were ignored.

Yu mentioned the groups made up of Filipinos and security contractors were at odds, and he had his doubts whether their actions would be a success. Despite their differences, the groups were able to locate Chang in an Abu Sayyaf jungle base camp in the Southern Philippine island province of Sulu. Yu declines to discuss what followed, but it resulted in a number of Abu Sayyaf members killed. Chang returned to Taiwan on December 21, 35 days after her ordeal began.

Yu petitioned the Taiwanese government to award its Medal of Valor to three Filipino soldiers. All three were awarded with the medals—the first time they were presented to foreign soldiers.

Parallels to the Chang An-wei incident were made to the later kidnapping in April 2014 of Chinese national Gao Huayun and Filipino hotel staffer Marcy Dayawan. Yu was interviewed by the South China Morning Post for his thoughts on the event and how it compared to the Chang An-wei incident.

== Civilian career ==
After leaving the military, Yu has worked as an equity swaps trader at Credit Suisse in Hong Kong in its Prime Services Department and with Palantir Technologies in its Asia-region business development department, based in Singapore.

Yu also worked as Director of Channels at Perx, loyalty-based mobile CRM platform with an automated and targeted marketing messaging system based in Singapore, chaired by Eduardo Saverin, and as Vice President of Corporate Development at migme Limited, a Foxconn-backed social entertainment platform and public company on the Australian Stock Exchange.

He also launched a mixed martial arts apparel company which creates fight gear, jiujitsu gi, and other apparel, FLOW MMA. Yu founded the company after training in mixed martial arts in Asia and discovering, while in Taiwan, that there were no MMA apparel companies that catered to Chinese fighters and enthusiasts. Yu has also served as a referee during Legend FC 8 and 10.

Yu partnered with Barron Lau, former CEO of Round5 (the licensee of official UFC and Bruce Lee action figurines) and Carol Chen, an apparel manufacturer for developing designs based in Chinese culture. Former UFC and ONE FC fighter Andy Wang was also recruited to help cultivate MMA fighters in China.

Yu is currently the CEO of Blackpanda, Asia's first combined physical-cyber incident response group, specializing in coverage of Asia-Pacific and hyper-focused on digital forensics and cyber crisis response and management; Resorts World Manila notably contracted the company to review its security procedures following the 2017 Resorts World Manila attack.
