= 2024 meeting of Ma Ying-jeou and Xi Jinping =

2024 meeting between the president of China and former president of Taiwan

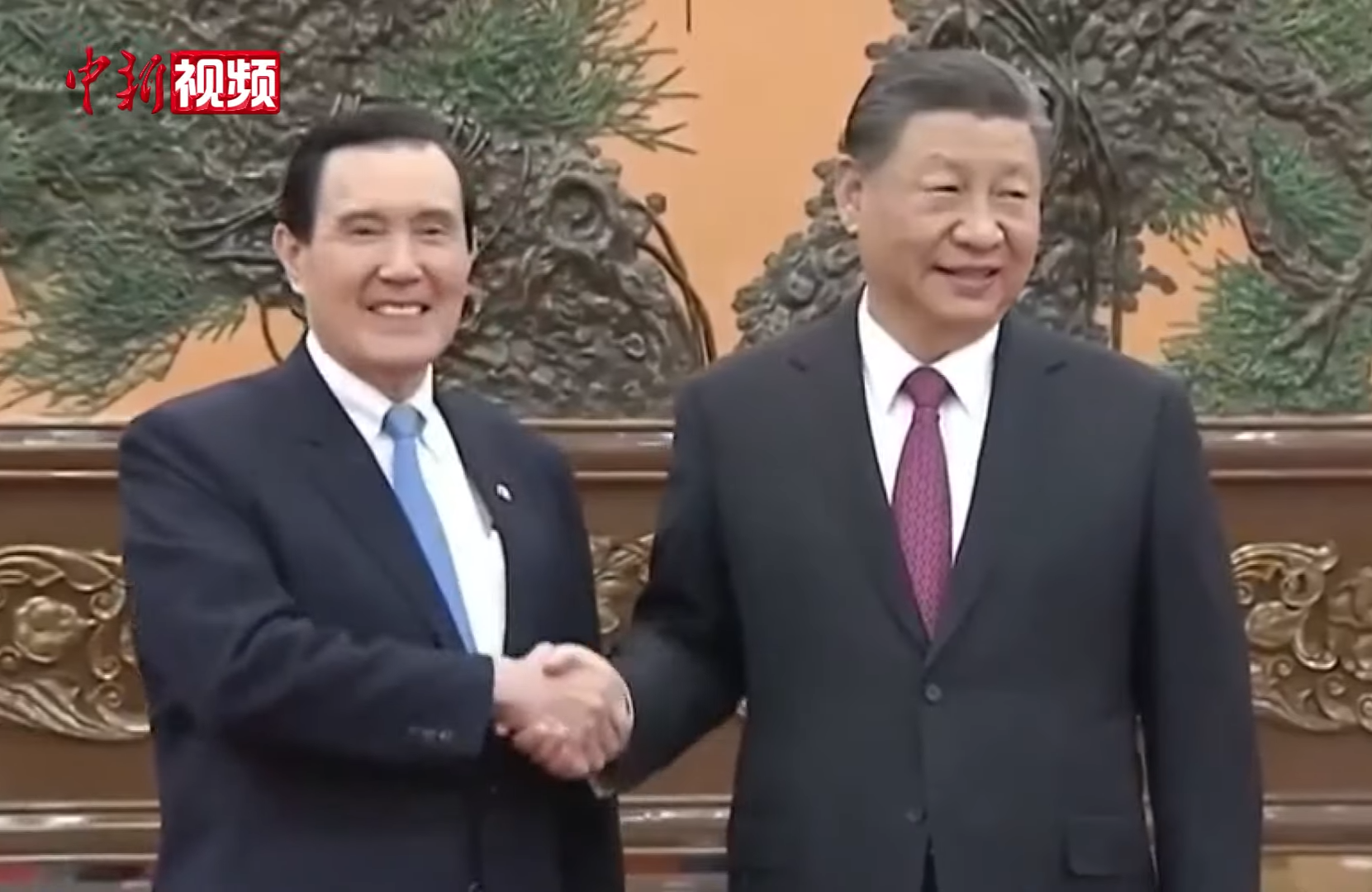
- Ma Ying-jeou (left) and Xi Jinping (right) shaking hands on 10 April 2024.
- Native name: 第二次习马会
- Date: 10 April 2024
- Venue: East Hall, Great Hall of the People
- Location: Beijing
- Participants: Ma Ying-jeou; Xi Jinping

On 10 April 2024, Ma Ying-jeou, the former president of the Republic of China (Taiwan; ROC), and Xi Jinping, the general secretary of the Chinese Communist Party (CCP) and president of the People's Republic of China (mainland China; PRC), met in Beijing. The meeting was the second meeting between Xi and Ma; the pair previously met in Singapore in 2015, when Ma was still the incumbent president. The meeting was part of Ma's 2024 visit to mainland China, his second visit during his post-presidency.

== Background ==
During his presidency from 2008 to 2016, Ma pushed for closer cross-strait relations. Xi and Ma previously met in 2015 in Singapore, in their capacities as the leaders of mainland China and Taiwan, respectively. Ma left office in 2016, and was succeeded by Tsai Ing-wen of the Democratic Progressive Party (DPP), which favors a more Taiwanese nationalist identity in contrast with Ma's Kuomintang.

== Meeting ==
At 4:00 p.m Beijing Time, Xi and Ma met at the East Hall of the Great Hall of the People, shaking hands for nearly 20 seconds.

As the PRC does not recognize the ROC, Xi referred to Ma as "Mr. Ma Ying-jeou" rather than the former president. Similarly, Ma referred to Xi by his title of Party General Secretary. Ma said "If war breaks out between the two sides of the Taiwan Strait, it’ll be unbearable for the Chinese nation", continuing by saying "Chinese people on both sides of the strait are definitely wise enough to handle various disputes peacefully and avoid conflicts".

Xi said "Compatriots on both sides of the Straits are all Chinese, there is no irritation that cannot be resolved, there is no problem that cannot be discussed, there is no force that can divide us".
