= Detlev F. Vagts =

American lawyer

Detlev Frederick Vagts (February 13, 1929 – August 20, 2013) was an American legal scholar. He was a professor of international law at Harvard Law School.

Vagts was born in Washington, D.C., to German poet-historian Alfred Vagts and Miriam Beard, the daughter of Charles A. Beard. He studied at Harvard College and later Harvard Law School, where he graduated with a Juris Doctor in 1951. After practicing at Cahill Gordon & Reindel for eight years—interrupted by service in the Judge Advocate General's Corps—Vagts joined faculty at his alma mater, receiving tenure in 1962. In 1984, having been the Eli Goldston Professor of Law for four years, Detlev Vagts was appointed Bemis Professor of International Law, succeeding Louis B. Sohn.

Academic offices
Previous: Louis B. Sohn	Bemis Professor of International Law (1984–2005)	Next: Noah Feldman
